= Whitby (barque) =

Steamer owned by the Commonwealth and Dominion Line

Coordinates: 36°25′18″S 174°4′12″E

History

United Kingdom
- Name: Whitby
- Owner: John Chapman & Co, 2 Leadenhall Street, London (Original owner)
- Builder: Henry and George Barrick, Whitby, Yorkshire
- Launched: 1837
- Fate: Wrecked April 1853

General characteristics
- Tons burthen: 437 (bm)
- Length: 99 ft 6 in (30 m)
- Beam: 24 ft 7 in (7 m)
- Depth of hold: 19 ft 7 in (6 m)
- Propulsion: Sail

Whitby was a three-masted, square-rigger launched in 1837 and later re-rigged as a barque. She was registered in London, and made voyages to India, British Guiana, Australia, and New Zealand. In 1841 Whitby, Arrow, and Will Watch carried surveyors and labourers for the New Zealand Company to prepare plots for the first settlers (scheduled to follow five months later). Whitby was wrecked at Kaipara Harbour in April 1853.

== Career ==
Whitby was originally built for the London-Calcutta route, and sailed there in May 1837. She arrived at Kedgeree, Bengal, on 12 November. In May 1838, she brought the first 270 apprenticed East Indian hill coolie migrants from Calcutta to Berbice and Demerara in British Guiana for Gillanders, Abuthnot and Co.

In 1839 Whitby transported 133 female convicts to Sydney. Under the command of Captain Thomas Wellbank, she left Dublin on 18 February and arrived at Sydney on 23 June.

On 20 June 1840 she left Sydney for New Zealand. On 19 December she was reported landing three rescued crew members from the Esperance and Hesperia at Grimsby. However, this may have been another ship, as she was reported sailing from Table Bay to Mauritius on 15 December. She was reported as being at Cork on 16 February 1841 having passed the Olympus, which was sailing to New Zealand. She arrived at Gravesend on 3 or 4 March, being noted as having sailed from Lombock.

Her first voyage to New Zealand was to Wellington under Captain Lacey. She arrived on 18 September 1841 at Port Nicholson. Her cargo included 20,000 bricks.

On 3 November, while under the command of Captain James Swinton, Whitby arrived at Nelson, New Zealand, with the Will Watch and Arrow. In October she had participated in the New Zealand Company's exploration of Golden Bay.

In 1842 seamen on board her were paid £3 5s per month.

Ownership changed in 1843 when she sold to Thomas Hawson in Moulmein, Burma, then part of British India. In 1844 she was sold to Phillip Richardson of London and 1848 to Thomas Radcliff of London.

On 3 February 1849 she left London with 165 immigrants to Melbourne, Australia. She arrived at Port Phillip on 28 June. On 31 July 1851 she had arrived from Port Phillip in Sydney.

In 1851 or 1852 Whitby underwent major repairs, including a new deck.

She sailed from Sydney on 30 September 1852 under the command of Captain Bruce, and arrived at Kaipara on 16 October to load a cargo of timber for Melbourne or Sydney. She had been earlier purchased by Mr Wright of Sydney for use by Wright and Grahame's line on the trans-Tasman trade. She sailed from Kaipara on the 19 December and arrived back in Sydney on 2 December. In March 1853 she again sailed from Sydney to Kaipara under Captain Bruce, arriving at Kaipara on 16 March. On this voyage one of the crew, Benjamin Leeland, fell into the Kaipara river and drowned.

== Loss ==
She was sailing under Captain Bruce with a full cargo of timber when she was lost on Tory Shoal at Kaipara on 24 April 1853. Fortunately all the crew survived.

== Monument ==
On 5 May 1988, a bronze sculpture of the Whitby was presented to the people of Guyana by the Indian government. It is located in the Guyana National Park in Georgetown.
