= New Zealand Company =

Company formed to colonise New Zealand

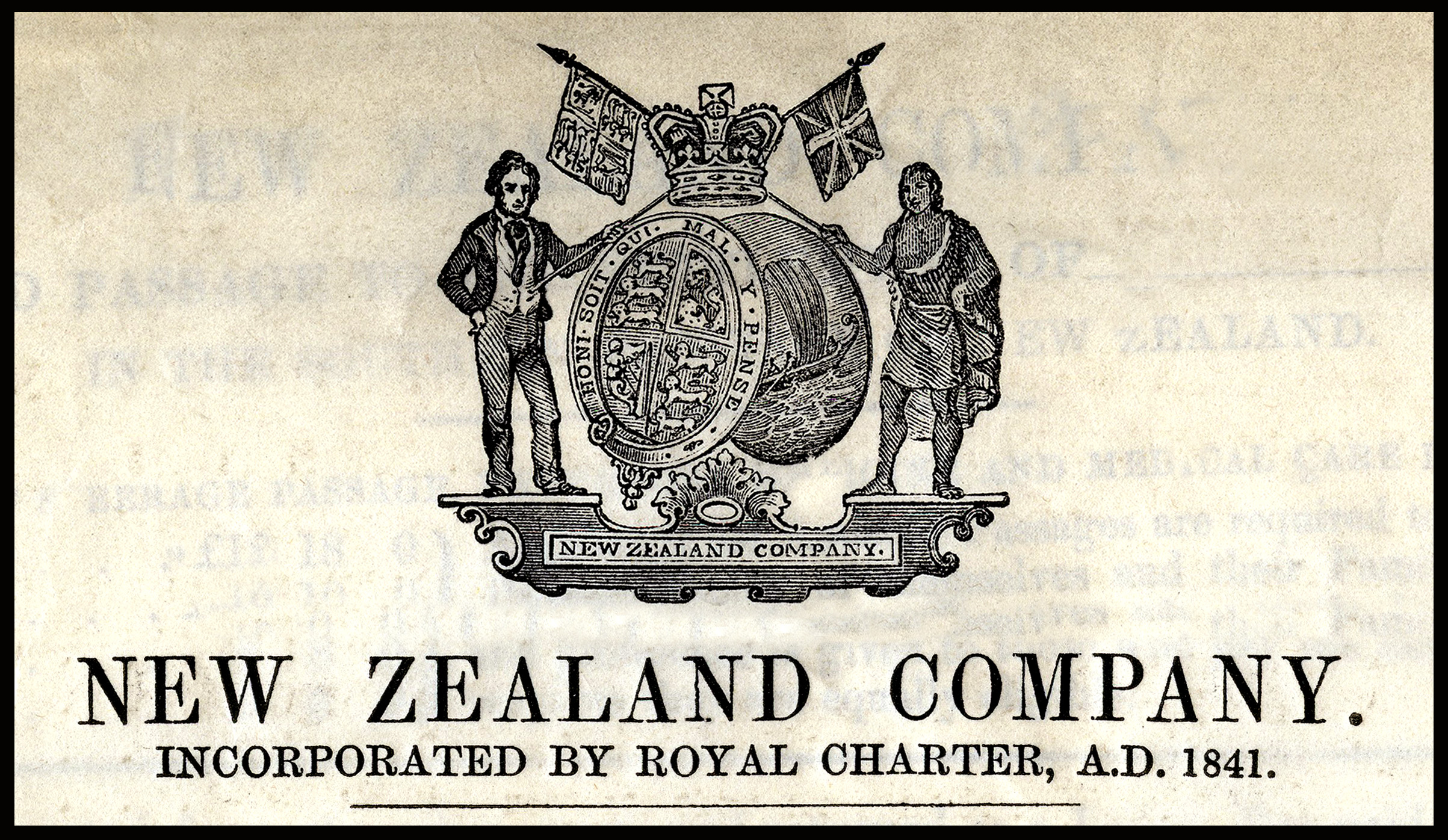
New Zealand Company coat of arms

The New Zealand Company, chartered in the United Kingdom, was a company that existed in the first half of the 19th century on a business model that was focused on the systematic colonisation of New Zealand. The company was formed to carry out the principles devised by Edward Gibbon Wakefield, who envisaged the creation of a new-model English society in the Southern Hemisphere. Under Wakefield's model, the colony would attract capitalists, who would then have a ready supply of labour: migrant labourers who could not initially afford to be property owners but would have the expectation of one-day buying land with their savings.

The New Zealand Company established settlements at Wellington, Nelson, Wanganui and Dunedin and also became involved in the settling of New Plymouth and Christchurch. The original New Zealand Company started in 1825, with little success, then rose as a new company when it merged with Wakefield's New Zealand Association in 1837, received its royal charter in 1840, reached the peak of efficiency about 1841, encountered financial problems from 1843 from which it never recovered, returned its charter in 1850 and wound up all remaining business with a final report in 1858.

== History ==
The company's board members included aristocrats, Members of Parliament and a prominent magazine publisher, who used their political connections to ceaselessly lobby the British government to achieve its aims. The company bought a lot of land from Māori using questionable contracts and in many cases resold that land, with its title in doubt. The company launched elaborate, grandiose and sometimes fraudulent advertising campaigns. It vigorously attacked those it perceived as its opponents—chiefly the British Colonial Office, successive governors of New Zealand, the Church Missionary Society and the prominent missionary Reverend Henry Williams, and it stridently opposed the Treaty of Waitangi, which was an obstacle to the company's obtaining the greatest possible amount of New Zealand land at the cheapest price. The company, in turn, was frequently criticised by the Colonial Office and New Zealand governors for its "trickery" and lies. Missionaries in New Zealand were also critical of the company for fear that its activities would lead to the "conquest and extermination" of Māori inhabitants.

The company viewed itself as a prospective quasi-government of New Zealand and in 1845 and 1846 proposed splitting the colony in two, along a line from Mokau in the west to Cape Kidnappers in the east, with the north reserved for Māori and missionaries and the south becoming a self-governing province, known as "New Victoria" and managed by the company for that purpose. The British Colonial Secretary rejected the proposal.

Only 15,500 settlers arrived in New Zealand as part of the company's colonisation schemes, but three of its settlements would, along with Auckland, become and remain the country's "main centres" and provide the foundation for the system of provincial government introduced in 1853.

=== 1825 expedition ===
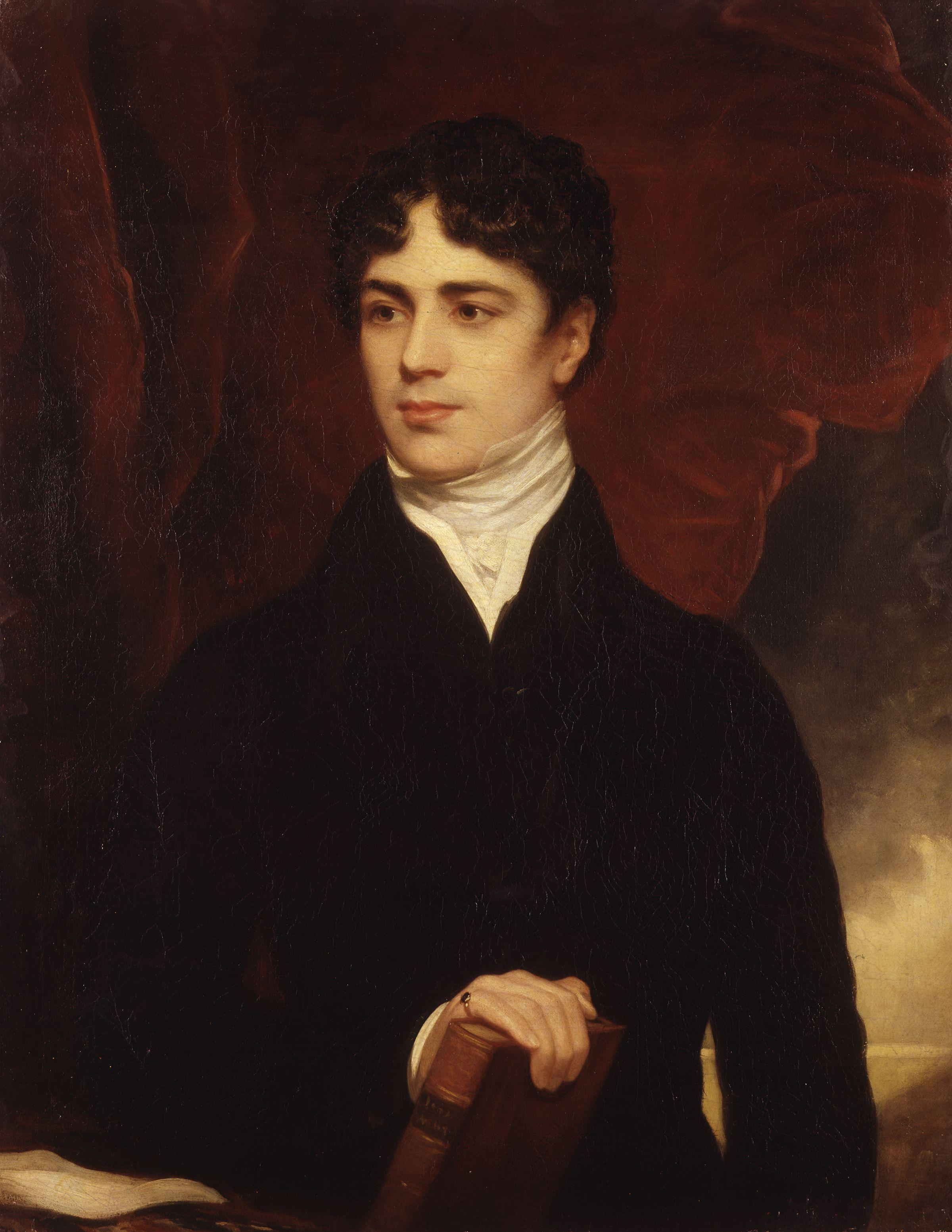
John George Lambton, the future Lord Durham

The earliest organised attempt to colonise New Zealand came in 1825, when the New Zealand Company was formed in London, headed by the wealthy John George Lambton, Whig MP (and later 1st Earl of Durham). Other directors of the company were:

- East India Company merchants George Lyall, George Palmer (snr), Stewart Marjoribanks and Russell Ellice;
- politician and merchant Edward Ellice (brother of Russell, and also brother-in-law of Lambton);
- political economist Robert Torrens snr; landowner and politician Edward Littleton (later 1st Baron Hatherton);
- Royal Navy officer and politician Courtenay Boyle;
- banker James Pattison (sometime chair of the East India Company, and later Governor of the Bank of England;
- writer and politician Aaron Chapman;
- politician and banker Abraham Wildey Robarts;
- shipping insurer Ralph Fenwick;
- solicitor John William Buckle;
- William Mannings; (Note: "Mannings" is an unusual surname. Could this be William Manning (British politician)? Note also that EJ Wakefield, in his 1845 book, Adventure in New Zealand, has a slightly different list of "members" of the association: Lyall, Marjoribanks, Palmer, Torrens, Lambton, Edward Ellice, Boyle, Buckle, Fenwick, Pattison, Littleton, Roberts, George Varlo, Anthony Gordon and John Dixon.) and
- James Faden.

The company unsuccessfully petitioned the British Government for a 31-year term of exclusive trade and for command of a military force. It anticipated that large profits could be made from New Zealand flax, kauri timber, whaling, and sealing.

Undeterred by the lack of government support for its plan to establish a settlement protected by a small military force, the company dispatched two ships to New Zealand the following year under the command of Captain James Herd, who was given the task of exploring trade prospects and potential settlement sites in New Zealand. On 5 March 1826 the ships, Lambton and Rosanna, reached Stewart Island, which Herd explored and then dismissed as a possible settlement, before sailing north to inspect land around Otago Harbour. Herd was unconvinced that area was the ideal location and sailed instead for Te Whanganui-a-Tara (present-day Wellington Harbour), which Herd named Lambton Harbour. Herd explored the area and identified land at the south-west of the harbour as the best place for a European settlement, ignoring the presence of a large pā that was home to members of Te Āti Awa tribe. The ships then sailed up the east coast to explore prospects for trade, stopping at the Coromandel Peninsula and the Bay of Islands. In January 1827 Herd surveyed parts of the harbour at Hokianga, where either he or the company's agent on board negotiated the "purchase" of tracts of land from Māori in Hokianga, Manukau and Paeroa. The price for the land was "five muskets, fifty three pounds powder, four pair blankets, three hundred flints and four musket cartridge boxes". After several weeks Herd and the New Zealand Company agent decided the cost of exporting goods was too high to be of economic value and they sailed to Sydney, where Herd paid off the crew and sold the stores and equipment, then returned to London. The venture had cost the New Zealand Company £20,000.

=== Wakefield's influence ===
The failure of Lambton's project came to the attention of 30-year-old aspiring politician Edward Gibbon Wakefield, who was serving three years in jail for abducting a 15-year-old heiress. Wakefield, who had grown up in a family with roots in philanthropy and social reform, also showed an interest in proposals by Robert Wilmot-Horton, Under-Secretary of State for War and the Colonies for state-assisted emigration programmes that would help British paupers escape poverty by moving to any of Britain's colonies. In 1829 Wakefield began publishing pamphlets and writing newspaper articles that were reprinted in a book, promoting the concept of systematic emigration to Australasia through a commercial profit-making enterprise.

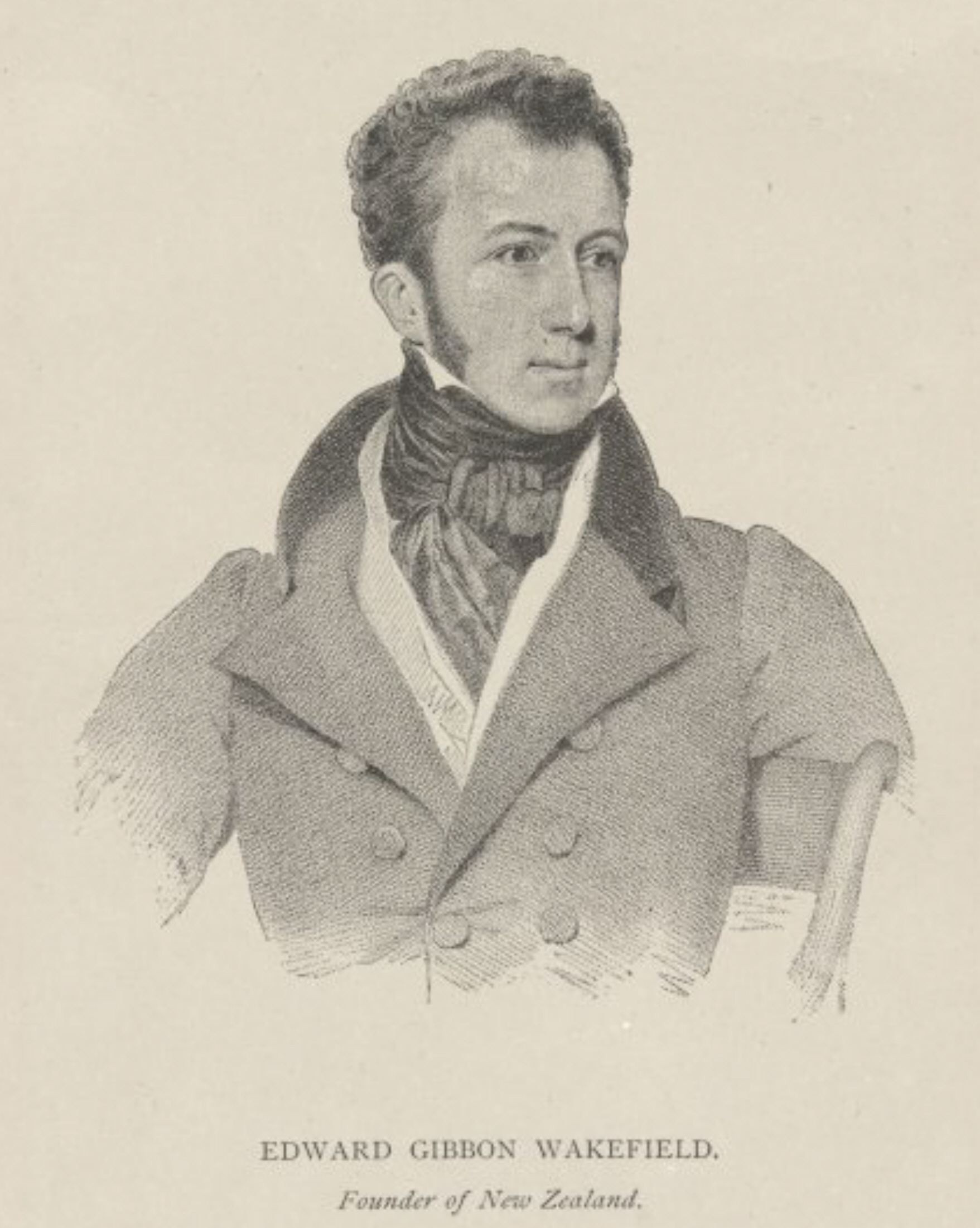
Edward Gibbon Wakefield

Wakefield's plan entailed a company buying land from the indigenous residents of Australia or New Zealand very cheaply, then selling it to speculators and "gentleman settlers" for a much higher sum. The immigrants would provide the labour to break in the gentlemen's lands and cater to their employers' everyday needs. They would eventually be able to buy their own land, but high land prices and low rates of pay would ensure they first laboured for many years.

In May 1830 Wakefield was released from prison and joined the National Colonisation Society, whose committee included Wilmot-Horton, nine MPs and three clergymen. Wakefield's influence within the society quickly grew and by the end of the year his plans for colonisation of Australasia had become the central focus of the society's pamphlets and lectures.

Despite the £20,000 loss incurred in his earlier venture, Lambton (from the 1830s known as Lord Durham) continued to pursue ways to become involved in commercial emigration schemes and was joined in his endeavours by Radical MPs Charles Buller and Sir William Molesworth. In 1831 and again in 1833 Buller and Molesworth backed Wakefield as he took to the Colonial Office elaborate plans to recreate a perfect English society in a new colony in South Australia in which land would be sold at a price high enough to generate profit to fund emigration. The Whig government in 1834 passed an Act authorising the establishment of the British Province of South Australia, but the planning and initial sales of land proceeded without Wakefield's involvement because of the illness and death of his daughter. Land in the town of Adelaide was offered at £1 per acre on maps showing town and country sites—though the area was still little more than a sandhill—but sales were poor. In March 1836 a survey party sailed for South Australia and the first emigrants followed four months later. Wakefield claimed all credit for the establishment of the colony, but was disappointed with the outcome, claiming the land had been sold too cheaply.

Instead, in late 1836, he set his sights on New Zealand, where his theories of "systematic" colonisation could be put into full effect. He gave evidence to a House of Commons committee which itself comprised many Wakefield supporters, and when the committee handed down a report endorsing his ideas, he wrote to Lord Durham explaining that New Zealand was "the fittest country in the world for colonisation". Wakefield formed the New Zealand Association, and on 22 May 1837 chaired its first meeting, which was attended by ten others including MPs Molesworth and William Hutt, and R.S. Rintoul of The Spectator. After the association's third meeting, by which time London banker John Wright, Irish aristocrat Earl Mount Cashell and Whig MP William Wolryche-Whitmore were also on board and the group was attracting favourable newspaper attention, Wakefield drafted a Bill to bring the association's plans to fruition.

The draft attracted stiff opposition from Colonial Office officials and from the Church Missionary Society, who took issue both with the "unlimited power" the colony's founders would wield and what they regarded as the inevitable "conquest and extermination of the present inhabitants". Parliamentary Under-Secretary for the colonies Lord Howick and Permanent Under-Secretary James Stephen both were concerned about proposals for the settlements' founders to make laws for the colony, fearing it would create a dynasty beyond British government control, while Anglican and Wesleyan missionaries were alarmed by claims made in pamphlets written by Wakefield in which he declared that one of the aims of colonisation was to "civilise a barbarous people" who could "scarcely cultivate the earth". Māori, Wakefield wrote, "craved" colonisation and looked up to the Englishman "as being so eminently superior to himself, that the idea of asserting his own independence of equality never enters his mind". Wakefield suggested that once Māori chiefs had sold their land to settlers for a very small sum, they would be "adopted" by English families and be instructed and corrected. At a meeting on 6 June 1837 the Church Missionary Society passed four resolutions expressing its objection to the New Zealand Association plans, including the observation that previous experience had shown that European colonisation invariably inflicted grave injuries and injustices on the indigenous inhabitants. It also said the colonisation plans would interrupt or defeat missionary efforts for the religious improvement and civilisation of the Māori. The society resolved to use "all suitable means" to defeat the association and both the Church and Wesleyan missionary societies began to wage campaigns in opposition to the company's plans, through pamphlets and lobbying to government.

=== Charter ===
In September 1837, four months after the New Zealand Association's first meeting, discussions began with the 1825 New Zealand Company over a possible merger. The 1825 company claimed ownership of a million acres of New Zealand land acquired during its 1826 voyage, and Lord Durham, chairman of that company, was suggested as an ideal chairman of the new partnership. By the end of the year he had been elected to that role.

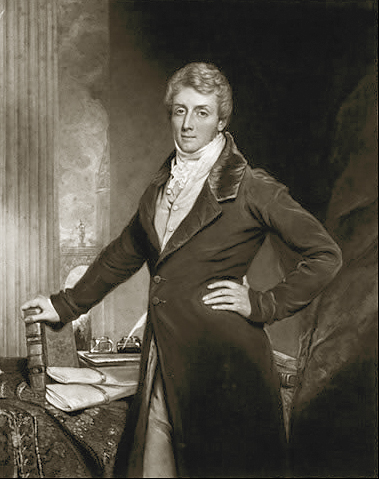
Colonial Secretary Lord Glenelg

Through late 1837 the New Zealand Association vigorously lobbied both the British government and Prime Minister Lord Melbourne, then returned with a revised Bill that addressed some of the government's concerns. On 20 December 1837 it was rewarded with the offer of a royal charter similar to those under which British colonies had been earlier established in North America. The chartered body was to take responsibility for the administration, and the legislative, judicial, military and financial affairs of the colony of New Zealand, subject to safeguards of control by the British Government. To receive the charter, however, the association was told by Colonial Secretary Lord Glenelg it would have to become a joint stock company, and therefore have "a certain subscribed capital". In a letter to Lord Durham, Lord Glenelg explained that the government was aware of the risks of the proposed New Zealand venture and knew that the South Australian colony established under the Wakefield system was already heavily in debt. It therefore considered it reasonable that the interests of shareholders should coincide with those of emigrants in the pursuit of the colony's prosperity. But members of the association decided the requirement was unacceptable. Reluctant to invest their own money in the venture, and wary of the risks of the shares being subject to fluctuations in the stock market, they rejected the offer. On 5 February 1838 the Colonial Secretary in turn advised Lord Durham that the charter had therefore been withdrawn. The New Zealand Association's plans would again hinge on a Bill being introduced to, and passed by, Parliament.

Public and political opinion continued to run against the association's proposals. In February 1838 The Times wrote disparagingly of the "moral and political paradise", the "radical Utopia in the Great Pacific" conceived in "the gorgeous fancy of Mr Edward Gibbon Wakefield", in March Parliament debated—then defeated—Molesworth's motion of no confidence in the Colonial Secretary over his rejection of the association's plans, and later that month the association's second Bill, introduced by Whig MP Francis Baring on 1 June, was defeated 92 votes to 32 at its second reading. Lord Howick described the failed Bill as "the most monstrous proposal I ever knew made to the House".

Three weeks after the Bill's defeat, the New Zealand Association held its final meeting and passed a resolution to the effect that "notwithstanding this temporary failure", members would persevere with their efforts to establish "a well-regulated system of colonization". Two months later, on 29 August 1838, 14 supporters of the association and the 1825 New Zealand Company convened to form a joint-stock company, the New Zealand Colonisation Association. Chaired by Lord Petre, the company was to have paid-up capital of £25,000 in 50 shares of £50, and declared its purpose was "the purchase and sale of lands, the promotion of emigration, and the establishment of public works". A reserved share of £500 was offered to Wakefield, who by then was in Canada, working on the staff of that colony's new governor general, Lord Durham. By December, although it was still yet to attract 20 paid-up shareholders, the company decided to buy the barque Tory for £5250 from Joseph Somes, a wealthy shipowner and member of the committee.

Within the British Government, meanwhile, concern had grown about the welfare of Māori and increasing lawlessness among the 2,000 British subjects in New Zealand, who were concentrated in the Bay of Islands. Because of the population of British subjects there, officials believed colonisation was now inevitable and at the end of 1838 the decision was made to appoint a Consul as a prelude to the declaration of British sovereignty over New Zealand. And when Lord Glenelg was replaced as Colonial Secretary in late February, his successor, Lord Normanby, immediately brushed off demands from the New Zealand Colonisation Association for the royal charter that had been previously offered to the New Zealand Association.

On 20 March 1839 an informal meeting of members of the Colonisation Association and the 1825 New Zealand Company learned from Hutt the disturbing news that the Government's Bill for the colonisation of New Zealand would contain a clause that land from then on would be able to be bought only from the Government. Such a move would be a catastrophic blow for the Colonisation Association, for whom success depended on being able to acquire land at a cheap price, directly from Māori, and then sell it at a high price to make a profit for shareholders and fund colonisation. The news created the need for swift action if private enterprise was to beat the Government to New Zealand. In a stirring speech, Wakefield told those present: "Possess yourselves of the soil and you are secure—but if from delay you allow others to do it before you, they will succeed and you will fail."

Members of the two colonisation groups subsequently formed a new organisation, the New Zealand Land Company, with Lord Durham as its governor and five MPs among its 17 directors (in 1840 the directors were Joseph Somes, Viscount Ingestre, M.P., Lord Petre, Henry A. Aglionby, M.P., Francis Baring, M.P., John Ellorker Boulcott, John William Buckle, Russell Ellice, James Robert Gowen, John Hine, William Hutt, M.P., Stewart Marjoribanks, Sir William Molesworth, M.P., Alexander Nairn, Alderman John Pirie, Sir George Sinclair, M.P., John Abel Smith, M.P., Alderman William Thompson, M.P., Frederick James Tollemache, M.P., Edward G. Wakefield, Sir Henry Webb, Arthur Willis, George Frederick Young). The company acted urgently to fit out the Tory, advertise for a captain and surveyor and select Colonel William Wakefield as the expedition's commander. William Wakefield was authorised to spend £3000 on goods that could be used to barter for land. By 12 May 1839, when the Tory left England under the command of Captain Edward Chaffers, the company had already begun advertising and selling land in New Zealand, and by the end of July—months before the company had even learned the Tory had arrived in New Zealand—all available sections for its first settlement had been sold. The company had already been warned in a letter from the Parliamentary Under-Secretary that the government could give no guarantee of title to land bought from Māori, which would "probably" be liable to repurchase by the Crown. The company had also been told that the Government could neither encourage nor recognise its proceedings.

The company's prospectus, issued on 2 May, detailed the Wakefield system of colonisation the company would carry out: 1100 sections, each comprising one "town acre" and 100 "country acres", would be sold in London, sight unseen, at £1 per acre, with the funds raised used to transport the emigrants to New Zealand. Emigrants would be selected either as capitalists or labourers, with labourers being required to work for the capitalists for several years before obtaining land of their own. One in 10 surveyed sections—scattered throughout the settlement—would be reserved for Māori who had been displaced, and the rest would be sold to raise £99,999, of which the company would retain 25 per cent to cover its expenses. Labourers would travel to New Zealand for free, while those who bought land and migrated could claim a 75 percent rebate on their fare.

=== 1839 expedition and land purchases ===
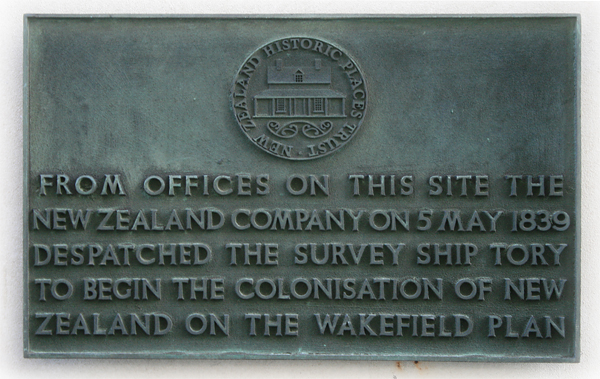
Plaque in Adam Street, London commemorating the New Zealand Company offices

The Tory was the first of three New Zealand Company surveyor ships sent off in haste to prepare for settlers in New Zealand. In August the Cuba, with a surveyors' team headed by Captain William Mein Smith, R.A., set sail, and a month later—still with no word on the success of the Tory and Cuba—on 15 September 1839 it was followed from Gravesend, London, by the Oriental, the first of five 500-ton immigrant ships hired by the company. Following the Oriental were the Aurora, Adelaide, Duke of Roxburgh and Bengal Merchant, plus a freight vessel, the Glenbervie, which all sailed with instructions to rendezvous on 10 January 1840 at Port Hardy on d'Urville Island where they would be told of their final destination. It was expected that by that time William Wakefield would have bought land for the first settlement and had it surveyed, and also inspected the company's land claims at Kaipara and Hokianga.

The company provided Wakefield with a lengthy list of instructions to be carried out on his arrival. He was told to seek land for settlements where there were safe harbours that would foster export trade, rivers allowing passage to fertile inland property, and waterfalls that could power industry. He was told the company was eager to acquire land around harbours on both sides of Cook Strait and that while Port Nicholson appeared the best site he should also closely examine Queen Charlotte Sound and Cloudy Bay at the north of the South Island. He was told to explain to Māori that the company wanted to buy land for resale to allow large-scale European settlement and that he should emphasise to tribes that in every land sale, one-tenth would be reserved for Māori, who would then live where they were assigned by a lottery draw in London. Wakefield was told:

You will readily explain that after English emigration and settlement a tenth of the land will be far more valuable than the whole was before ... the intention of the Company is not to make reserves for the Native owners in large blocks, as has been the common practice as to Indian reserves in North America, whereby settlement is impeded, and the savages are encouraged to continue savage, living apart from the civilized community ... instead of a barren possession with which they have parted, they will have a property in land intermixed with the property of civilised and industrious settlers and made really valuable by that circumstance.

Wakefield arrived at Cook Strait on 16 August and spent several weeks exploring the bays and sounds at the north of the South Island. The Tory crossed Cook Strait on 20 September and with the aid of whaler and trader Dicky Barrett—who had lived among Māori in Taranaki and the Wellington area since 1828 and also spoke "pidgin-Māori"—Wakefield began to offer guns, utensils and clothing to buy land from the Māori around Petone. Within a week he had secured the entire harbour and all surrounding ranges, and from then until November went on to secure signatures and marks on parchments that supposedly gave the company ownership of 20 million acres (8 million hectares)—about one-third of New Zealand's land surface at a cost of about a halfpenny an acre. On 25 October he persuaded 10 chiefs at Kapiti to add crosses at the foot of an 1180-word document that confirmed they were permanently parting with all "rights, claims, titles and interests" to vast areas of land in both the South and North Islands as far north as present-day New Plymouth. On 8 November in Queen Charlotte Sound he secured the signature of an exiled Taranaki chief, Wiremu Kīngi Te Rangitāke, and 31 others for land whose description was near-identical to that of the Kapiti deal. On 16 November as the Tory passed Wanganui three chiefs came aboard the Tory to negotiate the sale of all their district from Manawatu to Pātea. The areas in each deed were so vast Wakefield documented them by writing lists of place names, and finally expressed the company's territory in degrees of latitude.

Wakefield had learned from Barrett the complicated nature of land ownership in the Port Nicholson area because of past wars and expulsions and from late October Wakefield was informed of—but dismissed—rumours that Māori had sold land that did not belong to them. Problems with some of their purchases were emerging, however. Ngāti Toa chief Te Rauparaha boarded the Tory near Kapiti to tell Wakefield that in its October agreement Ngāti Toa intended the company to have not millions of acres at the top of the South Island, but just the two small areas of Whakatu and Taitapu. And in December, a week after arriving at Hokianga to inspect the land bought from the 1825 New Zealand Company, Wakefield was told by Ngāpuhi chiefs that the only land the New Zealand Land Company could claim in the north was about a square mile at Hokianga. Further, there was nothing at all for them at either Kaipara or Manukau Harbour. There was a prize for him, however, with his purchase on 13 December of the Wairau Valley in the north of the South Island. Wakefield bought the land for £100 from the widow of whaling Captain John Blenkinsopp, who had claimed to have earlier bought it off Te Rauparaha. That sale would lead to the 1843 Wairau Affray in which 22 English settlers and four Māori were killed.

Further purchases followed in Taranaki (60,000 acres in February 1840) and Wanganui (May 1840, the conclusion of negotiations begun the previous November); the company explained to the 1842 Land Claims Commission that while the earlier deeds covering the same land had been with the "overlords", these new contracts were with residents of the lands, to overcome any resistance they might have to yield physical possession of the land.

In July the company reported it had sent 1108 labouring emigrants and 242 cabin passengers to New Zealand and despatched a total of 13 ships. Another immigrant vessel, the London, sailed for New Zealand on 13 August, and before the year it was followed by Blenheim, Slains Castle, Lady Nugent, and Olympus.

=== Treaty of Waitangi ===
The Treaty of Waitangi gave the Crown a pre-emption right to purchase any Māori land being sold. Hobson began reviewing all earlier Maori land sales.

Under instructions from the Colonial Office, Hobson was to set up a system in which much of the revenue raised from the sale of land to settlers would be used to cover the costs of administration and development, but a portion of the funds would also be used to send emigrants to New Zealand. That plan, says historian Patricia Burns, was further proof of the "pervasive influence of the Wakefield theory".

In April the Rev. Henry Williams was sent south by Hobson to seek further signatures to the treaty in the Port Nicholson area. He was forced to wait for 10 days before local chiefs would approach him and blamed their reluctance to sign the treaty on pressure by William Wakefield. On 29 April, however, Williams was able to report that Port Nicholson chiefs had "unanimously" signed the treaty. William Wakefield was already strongly critical of both the treaty and Williams and repeatedly attacked the missionary in the company's newspaper for his "hypocrisy and unblushing rapaciousness".

Williams, in turn, was critical of the company's dealings, noting that the deeds of purchase for land it had claimed to have bought from the 38 deg. to the 42 degrees parallel of latitude were drawn up in English, which was not understood by Māori who had signed it, and that the company's representatives, including Barrett, had an equally poor grasp of Māori. Williams found that company representatives had met Māori chiefs at Port Nicholson, Kapiti and Taranaki, where neither party understanding the other and had not visited other places where the company claimed to have purchased land.

Hobson, meanwhile, was becoming alarmed at the news of the company's growing assumption of power. He learned of their bid to imprison a Captain Pearson of the barque Integrity and that on 2 March they had raised the flag of the United Tribes of New Zealand at Port Nicholson, proclaiming government by "colonial council" that claimed to derive its powers from authority granted by local chiefs. Interpreting the moves as smacking of "high treason," Hobson declared British sovereignty over the entirety of the North Island on 21 May 1840, and on 23 May declared the council illegal. He then despatched his Colonial Secretary, Willoughby Shortland, with 30 soldiers and six mounted police on 30 June 1840, to Port Nicholson to tear down the flag. Shortland commanded the residents to withdraw from their "illegal association" and to submit to the representatives of the Crown. Hobson, claiming his hand had been forced by the New Zealand Company's actions, also proclaimed sovereignty over the whole of New Zealand—the North Island by right of cession at Waitangi, and the South and Stewart Islands by right of discovery.

=== Wellington ===
Ignoring the wishes of William Wakefield, who wanted the initial settlement at the southwest side of the harbour where there were excellent anchorages for ships, Surveyor-General William Mein Smith began in January 1840 to layout 1100 one-acre (4047 m^{2}) sections of the town, initially called "Britannia", on the flat land at Pito-one (now Petone), at the north of the harbour. The sections, near the mouth of the Hutt River, were laid out in parallelograms, with the plan including boulevards and public parks. Settlers who had bought a town section had also bought 100 "country acres" (about 40ha), where they could grow their food. Smith considered it important to locate the town and country areas close together and the Hutt Valley appeared to promise that space. The drawback was that his chosen locality was a mix of dense forest, scrub, flax and swamp, its river was prone to flooding and the beach so flat that when the first passenger ships began to arrive—just four days after Smith began his survey work—they were forced to anchor 1600 metres from the shore. But construction of temporary houses began, as well as the assembly of wooden houses that had been carried on each ship, while tents also soon dotted the dunes behind the beach. Local Māori assisted with the construction and also provided food—fish, potatoes and other vegetables and occasionally pork.

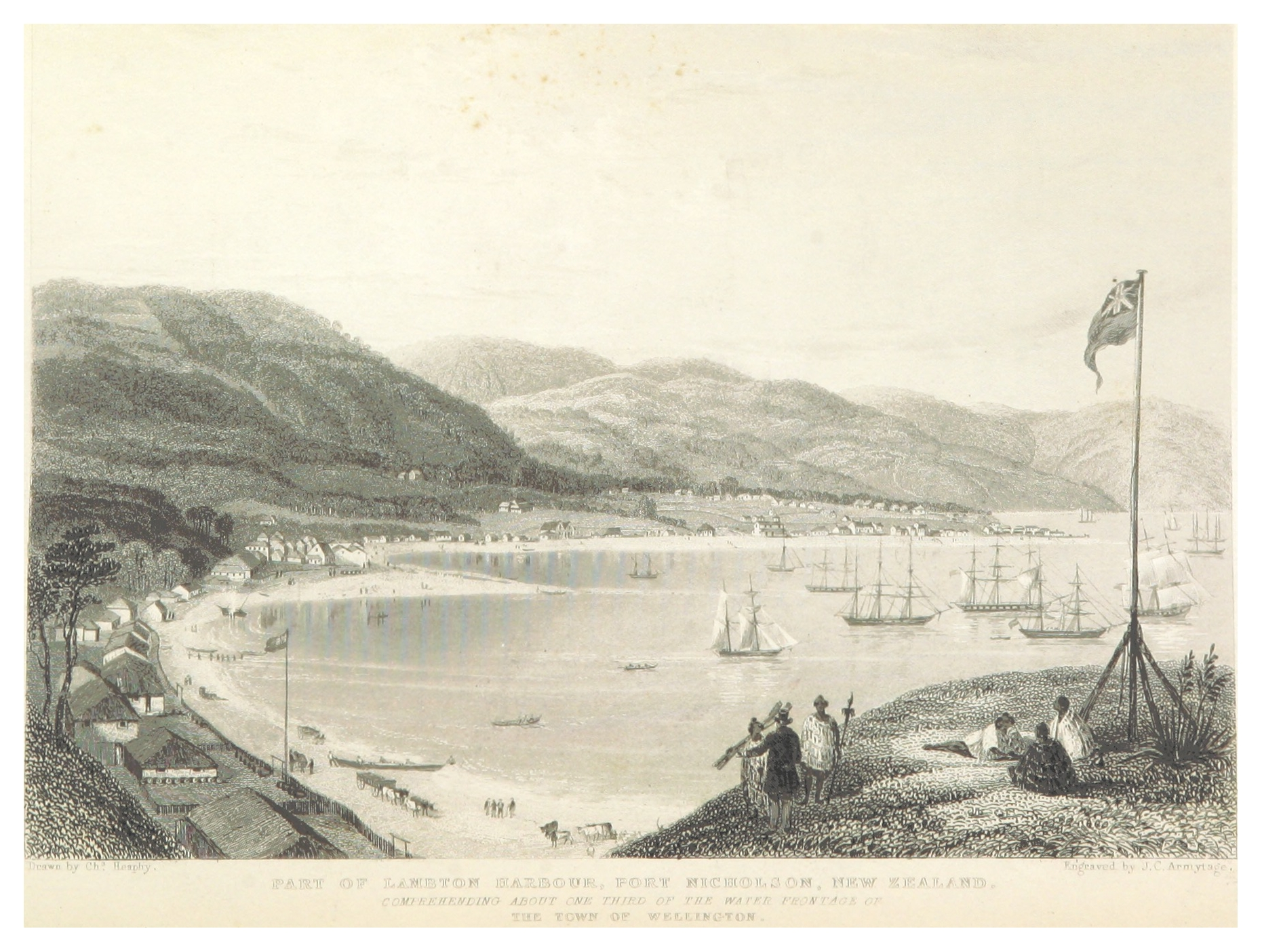
Lambton Harbour at Port Nicholson.

Eight weeks later, in March, after all passenger ships had arrived, settlers voted to abandon surveying at Pito-one—where the swamps, repeated flooding and poor anchorage facilities were proving too much of an obstacle—and move the town to Wakefield's preferred location of Thorndon at Lambton Bay (later Lambton Quay), which was named in honour of Lord Durham. Surveyors quickly encountered problems, however, when they discovered the land selected for the new settlement was still inhabited by Māori, who expressed astonishment and bewilderment to find Pākehā tramping through their homes, gardens and cemeteries and driving wooden survey pegs into the ground. Surveyors became involved in skirmishes with the Māori, most of whom refused to budge, and were provided with weapons to continue their work.

Wakefield had purchased the land during a frantic week-long campaign the previous September, with payment made in the form of iron pots, soap, guns, ammunition, axes, fish hooks, clothing—including red nightcaps—slates, pencils, umbrellas, sealing wax and jaw harps. Signatures had been gained from local chiefs after an explanation, given by Wakefield and interpreted by Barrett, that the land would no longer be theirs once payment was made. Evidence later provided to the Spain Land Commission—set up by the Colonial Office to investigate New Zealand Company land claims—revealed three major flaws: that chiefs representing pā of Te Aro, Pipitea and Kumutoto, where the settlement of Thorndon was to be sited, were neither consulted nor paid; that Te Wharepōuri, an aggressive and boastful young chief eager to prove his importance, had sold land he did not control; and that Barrett's explanation and interpretation of the terms of the sale was woefully inadequate. Barrett told the Spain Commission hearing in February 1843: "I said that when they signed their names the gentlemen in England who had sent out the trade might know who were the chiefs." Historian Angela Caughey also claimed it was extremely unlikely that Wakefield and Barrett could have visited all the villages at Whanganui-a-Tara in one day to explain the company's intentions and seek approval.

In line with his instructions, Wakefield promised local Māori they would be given reserves of land equal to one-tenth of the area, with their allotments chosen by lottery and sprinkled among the European settlers. The reserves were to remain inalienable to ensure that the Māori would not quickly sell the land to speculators. Jerningham Wakefield, the nephew of William Wakefield who had also arrived on the Tory in 1839, espoused the company's hope that interspersing Māori with white settlers would help them change their "rude and uncivilised habits". In a later book on his New Zealand adventures he wrote: "The constant example before their eyes, and constant emulation to attain the same results, would naturally lead the inferior race, by an easy ascent, to a capacity for acquiring the knowledge, habits, desires and comforts of their civilised neighbours."

In November 1840, the New Zealand Company directors advised Wakefield that they wished to name the town at Lambton Harbour after the Duke of Wellington in recognition of his strong support for the company's principles of colonisation and his "strenuous and successful defence against its enemies of the measure for colonising South Australia". Settlers enthusiastically accepted the proposal. The New Zealand Gazette and Wellington Spectator was published in Wellington from 1840 to 1844. Initially privately owned by Samuel Revans, it was regarded as a "mouthpiece of the New Zealand Company".

=== Nelson ===
In April 1841 the company informed the Colonial Secretary of its intention to establish a second colony "considerably larger" than the first. The colony was initially to be called Molesworth after Radical MP Sir William Molesworth, a supporter of Wakefield, but was renamed Nelson (after the British admiral) when Molesworth showed little interest in leading the colony. It was planned to cover 201,000 acres (810 km^{2}), consisting of 1000 allotments. Each would be 150 acres (60 hectares) of rural land, 50 acres (20 hectares) of accommodation land and one "town acre" (4000 square metres), with half the funds raised by land sales being spent on emigration and about £50,000 ending up as company profits. The land would be sold at £301 per allotment or 30 shillings an acre, one pound an acre more than land at Wellington, with a lottery to determine the ownership of specific allotments.

Three ships, the Arrow, Whitby, and Will Watch, sailed that month for New Zealand with surveyors and labourers to prepare plots for the first settlers (scheduled to follow five months later). Land sales proved disappointing, however, and threatened the viability of the settlement: by early June only 326 allotments had been sold, with only 42 purchasers intending to actually travel to New Zealand. Things had improved little by the drawing of the lottery in late August 1841, when only 371 of the allotments were drawn by purchasers, three-quarters of whom were absentee owners.

The ships arrived at Blind Bay (today known as Tasman Bay), where the expedition leaders searched for land suitable for the new colony, before settling on the site of present-day Nelson, an area described as marshy land covered with scrub and fern. In a meeting with local Māori, expedition leader Arthur Wakefield claimed to have gained recognition – in exchange for "presents" of axes, a gun, gunpowder, blankets, biscuits and pipes – for the 1839 "purchases" in the area by William Wakefield. By January 1842 the advance guard had built more than 100 huts on the site of the future town in preparation for the arrival of the first settlers. A month later the township was described as having a population of 500, along with bullocks, sheep, pigs and poultry, although the company was yet to identify or purchase any of the rural land for which purchasers had paid.

The search for this remaining 200,000 acres (810 km^{2}) would ultimately lead to the Wairau Affray – then known as the "Wairau Massacre" – of 17 June 1843, when 22 Europeans and four Māori died in a skirmish over land in the Wairau Valley, 25 km from Nelson. Arthur Wakefield claimed to have bought the land from the widow of a whaler who, in turn, had claimed to have bought it from chief Te Rauparaha. The chief denied having sold it. Although settlers in Nelson and Wellington were appalled at the slaughter at Wairau, an investigation by Governor Robert FitzRoy laid the blame squarely at the feet of the New Zealand Company representatives.

As early as 1839 the New Zealand Company had resolved to "take steps to procure German emigrants" and appointed an agent in Bremen. A bid in September 1841 to sell the Chatham Islands to the German Colonisation Company—yet to be formed—for £10,000 was quashed by the British Government, which declared that the islands were to be part of the colony of New Zealand and that any Germans settling there would be treated as aliens. The party of German migrants on the St Pauli, with 140 passengers including John Beit, the "overbearing and arrogant, greedy, untruthful" New Zealand Company agent in Hamburg, went to Nelson instead.

=== Government intervention ===
The New Zealand Company had begun its colonisation scheme without the approval of the British government; as late as May 1839 Parliamentary Under-secretary Henry Labouchere warned company director William Hutt that there was no guarantee that titles to land purchased from Māori would be recognised and that such land would be subject to repurchase by the Crown. In January and February 1840 both New South Wales Governor George Gipps and Hobson in New Zealand issued proclamations that all land previously purchased from Māori would have to be confirmed by government title, and that any future direct purchases from Māori were null and void.

Gipps introduced his New Zealand Land Claims Bill to the New South Wales Legislative Council in May 1840, instituting a process to appoint commissioners who would investigate all lands acquired from Māori and the conditions under which the transactions had taken place. The Bill also stipulated that Māori owned only the land which they "occupied", by living on or cultivating it; all other land was deemed "waste" land and owned by the Crown. The subsequent Act, passed on 4 August, prohibited the grant of any land purchase greater than four square miles (2560 acres). The New Zealand Company had already claimed to have bought two million acres (8,000 km^{2}), part of which it had sold directly to settlers, and when news of the government move reached Wellington in August it sparked panic, prompting hundreds of settlers to prepare to abandon their land and sail to Valparaíso, Chile. In a bid to restore certainty to the settlers over their land claims a three-man deputation was sent to Sydney to meet Gipps; in early December the deputation returned with news that Gipps would procure for the Wellington settlers a confirmation of their titles to 110,000 acres of land, as well as their town, subject to several conditions including that the 110,000 acres were taken in one continuous block, native reserves were guaranteed and that reserves were made for public purposes.

In late September or early October 1840, MP and New Zealand Company Secretary Charles Buller appealed to the Colonial Office for help for the company which he claimed was in "distress". Over the next month, the two parties negotiated a three-part agreement that, once agreed, was hailed by the company as "all that we could desire". Colonial Secretary Lord John Russell agreed to offer a royal charter for 40 years, which would allow the company to buy, sell, settle and cultivate lands in New Zealand, with the Colonial Land and Emigration Commission, formed in January 1840, to have oversight of the company's colonisation activities. Russell also agreed to assess the total sum of money the company had spent on colonisation and then grant the company title to four acres for every pound it had expended. In return, the company would relinquish its claim to 20 million acres. He also promised the company a discount—at a level to be decided later—for a purchase from the government of 50,000 acres. The company began providing figures to the Colonial Office of its total outgoings, which included £20,000 paid to the 1825 company and £40,000 paid to the New Zealand Colonisation Company of 1838 as well as £5250 paid for the Tory. The company's spending on placards, printing and advertising, employee salaries, and food and transport for the emigrants were also included in the total, along with the costs of goods, including firearms, that had been used to buy land. A final calculation in May 1841 was that under the agreed formula the company was entitled to an initial 531,929 acres, with possibly another 400,000 to 500,000 acres to come. In May Russell agreed to allow the company a 20 per cent discount on the cost of 50,000 acres it wished to buy in New Plymouth and Nelson.

Hobson visited the Wellington area for the first time in August 1841 and heard complaints first-hand from Māori both in the town and also from as far afield as Porirua and Kapiti that they had never sold their land. Hobson assured them that their unsold pā and cultivations would be protected, but within days provided William Wakefield with a schedule, dated 1 September, which identified 110,000 acres at Port Nicholson, Porirua and Manawatu, 50,000 acres at Wanganui and 50,000 acres (later lifted to 60,000 acres) at New Plymouth; the government would waive its rights of pre-emption in those defined areas (thus abandoning any move to reclaim or resell lands possibly still owned by "residents" in the wake of the company's purchase from the "overlords"), and in a confidential note Hobson promised that the government would "sanction any equitable arrangement you may make to induce those natives who reside within the limits referred to in the accompanying schedule, to yield up possession of their habitations" as long as no force was used. FitzRoy pressured Te Aro Māori to accept £300 for valuable land in the middle of Wellington for which they had never been paid, by explaining that their land was almost valueless.

=== New Zealand Land Commission ===
In May 1842 Hampshire attorney William Spain, who had been appointed by Russell in January 1841 as an independent Land Commissioner, opened his official inquiry into New Zealand Company land claims and any non-Company counter-claims to the same lands. Spain quickly discovered that the New Zealand Company purchases in the Port Nicholson, Wanganui, and New Plymouth districts were hotly contested by Māori. In Wellington several important chiefs, notably those of Te Aro, Pipitea and Kumutoto pā took little or no part in the proceedings. Those in favour of "selling" the land gave two main reasons for their stance: European arms and settlement would give them protection against their enemies, notably the Ngāti Raukawa of Ōtaki who were expected to attack at any time; and they were aware of the wealth that a European settlement—"their Pākehā"—would bring them through trade and employment. Some sales were also motivated by complex power struggles among Māori iwi, with assent to purchases deemed as proof of status. Company officials and the Colonial Office in London each argued that if the Māori were to be compensated for land they had not sold, the other should pay it; the Colonial Office claimed that its agreement of November 1840 was made on the assumption that the company's claim was valid, while the company objected to being asked to prove that Māori in all transactions had both understood the contracts and had the right to sell. Company representatives in London attempted to challenge the legality of Spain's inquiry and instructed William Wakefield that he should not answer to it.

Spain, who was given a price scale that determined arbitrarily what each purchase should have been worth, concluded each of his investigations into the validity of the New Zealand Company purchases by announcing how much land they would be rewarded. The company was awarded 151,000 acres (61,155ha)at Nelson after payment of £800 but the claim on the Wairau valley was rejected. At Wellington the company was ordered to pay £1500 to complete the Port Nicholson agreement and it was then awarded 71,900 acres (29,100ha). Spain refused a Crown grant of any land at Porirua and promised just 100 acres (40.5ha) at Manawatu. He awarded 40,000 acres (16,200ha) at Wanganui and 60,000 acres (24,300ha) at Taranaki. In London, the Colonial Office had already decided that land claimed by settlers but not awarded to them by the Land Claims Commission should revert not to the Māori owners, but to the Crown.

The Taranaki ruling led to Spain's downfall. Spain had made the decision based on information from William Wakefield that much of the Taranaki region had been sparsely populated by Māori at the time of the purchase. The cause of the depopulation was that most of the local Te Āti Awa population had either migrated to Ōtaki or the Cook Strait region after defeat by raiding Waikato war parties in the 1820s, or been enslaved by the Waikato, but many were now returning. Spain ruled that regardless of the reason for their departure, Te Āti Awa had forfeited the land and that the company purchase from the few remaining residents was valid. With tensions between settlers and Māori in Taranaki at an all-time high, and alerted by Protector of Aborigines George Clarke of problems with Spain's Taranaki ruling, FitzRoy sailed in August 1844 for New Plymouth, where he was briefed by Bishop George Selwyn and then announced he would reverse Spain's decision. Instead of the 60,000 acres in Taranaki, the company would be awarded just 3800 acres, where settlers were already located. The decision outraged settlers, who were aware of friction with returning Māori, but had been hoping the Governor would station a body of troops at New Plymouth or sanction the formation of a militia to protect their land. FitzRoy later wrote: "It appeared so clear ... that the view taken by the land commissioner could not be adopted by the government without causing bloodshed, and the probable ruin of the settlement; because the injustice of awarding land to the New Zealand Company, which was well known not to have been purchased by them, was apparent to every native." FitzRoy's decision infuriated Spain, whose resignation was then demanded by the Governor.

Spain's award in Wanganui also failed to be delivered in full: some chiefs refused to sell regardless of the amount of compensation offered. Spain offered to return to Māori four sections of land along with £1000, which Wakefield attempted to distribute with the money in gold and silver, but when they continued to refuse Spain informed them their refusal would not prevent the land from going to the settlers.

=== Further settlements ===
The New Zealand Company also established a settlement at Wanganui in 1840, chiefly as a spillover settlement, the site of the rural land promised to Wellington purchasers. A traveller in the colony at the time described Wanganui as "one of the unwholesome, mushroom settlements engendered by the New Zealand Company for the purpose of removing to a distance a portion of the clamorous script-holders who, on arriving from England, looked, and looked in vain, for their land." The Wanganui settlement was beset with problems when settlers arrived to find Māori on the land, denying it had been sold. The company also sent surveyors down the east coast of the South Island to consider further sites, where they made contact at Akaroa with the fledgling French colony established there under the auspices of Jean-François Langlois's Nanto-Bordelaise Company.

The company also became indirectly involved in the settlement of New Plymouth in 1841, through its links with the Plymouth Company, to which it sold a total of 60,000 acres, of indeterminate location, in mid-1840. The Plymouth Company sent a survey party to choose where the settlement would be located and in January 1841 that company's surveyor, Frederick Carrington, selected Taranaki. The Plymouth Company encountered financial difficulties that led to a merger of the two companies on 10 May 1841.

In July 1843 the New Zealand Company issued a prospectus for the sale of 120,550 acres (48,000 hectares), divided between town, suburban and rural lots at a new settlement called New Edinburgh. The location of the settlement still remained undetermined. An office was established in Edinburgh to attract Scottish emigrants. A 400,000 acre (160,000 hectare) block was selected around the harbour at Otago in January 1844. The company worked with the Lay Association of the Free Church of Scotland on the sale of, and ballot for, land and the first body of settlers sailed for what became the settlement of Dunedin in late November 1847.

A month later Gibbon Wakefield began actively promoting a plan he had proposed in 1843: a Church of England settlement. New Zealand Company directors initially hoped to site the settlement in the Wairarapa region in the lower North Island. When local Māori refused to sell, however, its surveyor inspected Port Cooper (Lyttelton Harbour) on the east coast of the South Island and chose this as the location. Land was bought from 40 members of the Ngāi Tahu iwi in June 1848. The colonising efforts were taken up by the Canterbury Association, Gibbon Wakefield's new project, and the New Zealand Company became a silent partner in the settlement process, providing little more than the initial purchase funds. The first of the body of 1512 Canterbury settlers sailed on 8 September 1850 for their new home.

- For more information on New Zealand Company involvement in New Plymouth, see History of New Plymouth
- For more information on New Zealand Company involvement in Christchurch, see Canterbury Association

=== Financial difficulties and dissolution ===
The New Zealand Company began falling into financial difficulties from mid-1843 for two reasons. It had planned to buy land cheaply and sell it dearly and anticipated that a colony based on a higher land price would attract affluent colonists. The profits from the sale of land were to be used to pay for free passage of the working-class colonists and for public works, churches and schools for instance. For this scheme to work it was important to get the right proportion of labouring to propertied immigrants. In part the failure of the company's plans were because this proportion was never achieved – there were always more labourers, whose emigration was heavily subsidised by the company, than landed gentry.

New Zealand Company Act 1846
- Act of Parliament
- Parliament of the United Kingdom
- Long title: An Act to authorize a Loan from the Consolidated Fund to the New Zealand Company.
- Citation: 9 & 10 Vict. c. 42
- Territorial extent: United Kingdom

Dates
- Royal assent: 3 August 1846
- Commencement: 3 August 1846 (Note: The Acts of Parliament (Commencement) Act 1793.)
- Repealed: 11 August 1875
Other legislation
Amended by	New Zealand Company (No. 2) Act 1846
Repealed by	Statute Law Revision Act 1875

Status: Repealed

Text of statute as originally enacted

New Zealand Company Act 1846
- Act of Parliament
- Parliament of the United Kingdom
- Long title: An Act to grant certain Powers to the New Zealand Company.
- Citation: 9 & 10 Vict. c. ccclxxxii
- Territorial extent: United Kingdom

Dates
- Royal assent: 18 August 1846
- Commencement: 18 August 1846

Status: Current legislation

Text of statute as originally enacted

New Zealand Company (No. 2) Act 1846
- Act of Parliament
- Parliament of the United Kingdom
- Long title: An Act to amend an Act of the present Session for authorizing a Loan from the Consolidated Fund to the New Zealand Company.
- Citation: 9 & 10 Vict. c. 82
- Territorial extent: United Kingdom

Dates
- Royal assent: 26 August 1846
- Commencement: 26 August 1846
- Repealed: 11 August 1875
Other legislation
Amends	New Zealand Company Act 1846
Repealed by	Statute Law Revision Act 1875

Status: Repealed

Text of statute as originally enacted

The second major flaw arose because a large proportion of the land in the new colony was bought for speculative reasons by people who had no intention of migrating to New Zealand and developing the land they had bought. This meant that the new colonies had a serious shortage of employers and consequently a shortage of work for the labouring classes. From the outset, the New Zealand Company was forced to be the major employer in the new colonies and this proved a serious financial drain on the company. Repeated approaches were made to the British government seeking financial assistance and in late 1846 the company accepted an offer for a £236,000 advance with strict conditions on, and oversight of, future company operations.

In June 1850 the company admitted land sales in Wellington, Nelson and New Plymouth had remained poor and its land sales for the year ended April 1849 amounted to only £6,266. With little prospect of trading its way to profitability, the company surrendered its charter. A select committee report concluded the company's losses were "mainly attributable to their own proceedings, characterised as they were in many respects by rashness and maladministration."

Gibbon Wakefield, who had resigned from the company in disgust after its 1846 financial arrangement with the British government, remained defiant to the end, declaring in 1852 that had the company been left alone it would have paid a dividend, recouped its capital "and there would now be 200,000 settlers in New Zealand".

The New Zealand Constitution Act 1852 (15 & 16 Vict. c. 72) provided for a quarter of the proceeds of land sales of land previously purchased by the New Zealand Company would go to pay off the debt until it was paid off.

The company, in its final report in May 1858, conceded it had erred, but said the communities they had planted had now assumed "gratifying proportions" and they could look forward to the day when "New Zealand shall take her place as the offspring and counterpart of her Parent Isle ... the Britain of the Southern Hemisphere."

== See also ==
- New Zealand Company ships
- Canterbury Association
- Otago Association

== Bibliography ==
- Burns, Patricia (1989). Fatal Success: A History of the New Zealand Company. Heinemann Reed. ISBN 0-7900-0011-3.
- Caughey, Angela (1998). The Interpreter: The Biography of Richard "Dicky" Barrett. David Bateman Ltd. ISBN 1-86953-346-1.
- King, Michael (2003). The Penguin History of New Zealand. Penguin Books. ISBN 0-14-301867-1.
- Moon, Paul (2012). A Savage Country. Auckland: Penguin. ISBN 9780143567387.
- Orange, Claudia (1987). The Treaty of Waitangi. Wellington: Allen & Unwin. ISBN 0868614270.
- Tonk, Rosemarie V. (May 1986). The first New Zealand land commissions, 1840–1845 (MA thesis, University of Canterbury, Christchurch).
