= Dicky Barrett (trader) =

Richard Barrett (1807–1847) was one of the first European traders to be based in New Zealand. He lent his translation skills to help negotiate the first land purchases from Maori in New Plymouth and Wellington and became a key figure in the establishment of the settlement of New Plymouth. He was described by Edward Jerningham Wakefield, son of New Zealand Company founder Edward Gibbon Wakefield, as short, stout and "perfectly round all over" and fond of relating "wild adventures and hairbreadth 'scapes".

== Sailor, trader and whaler ==
Barrett was born and raised in the slums of either Durham or Bermondsey, England He spent six years as a sailor and arrived in Taranaki from Sydney as a mate on the trading vessel Adventure in March 1828. He and captain John Agar "Jacky" Love established a trading post at Ngamotu (site of modern-day New Plymouth), trading muskets and trinkets for flax, maize, wheat and vegetables grown by local Te Atiawa Māori. The trading post attracted increasing numbers of passing ships.

Barrett picked up a rudimentary understanding of the Māori language, was given the name of Tiki Parete and married Rawinia, the daughter of a local chief.

In 1832 Barrett and his former crewmates (recalled as Akerau, probably Akers, Tamiriri, probably Wright, Kopiri probably Phillips, and Oliver in 1873) joined local Maori in the Otaka pā at Ngamotu (Moturoa) to aid their defence in the face of an attack by heavily armed Waikato Māori, firing on the invaders with three cannon, using nails, iron scraps and stones for ammunition. The siege lasted more than three weeks before the Waikato withdrew, leaving a battle scene strewn with bodies, many of which had been cannibalised. In June Barrett and Love migrated south with as many as 3000 Atiawa Māori.

In late 1833 or early 1834 Barrett and Love established a whaling station at Queen Charlotte Sound.

== Negotiator ==
In September 1839 Barrett sailed from Queen Charlotte Sound to Port Nicholson aboard the Tory with representatives of the New Zealand Company to help negotiate the purchase of land there. The party remained there for about 10 days, ultimately securing the signatures of 16 Maori on a deed (written in English) for the purchase of an estimated 64,000ha in the Wellington area. The Waitangi Tribunal noted in its 2003 report on the Port Nicholson land purchases that Barrett – who it describes as having "marked incompetence as an interpreter" – was unable to translate the deed into Maori and "quite incapable of conveying its meaning ... to the assembled Maori".

Barrett was later described by a contemporary as speaking "whaler Maori, a jargon that bears much the same relation to the real language of the Maori as the pigeon English of the Chinese does to our mother tongue".

In November 1839 Barrett arrived in Taranaki on the Tory to negotiate the purchase of land from his wife's iwi, remaining there while Wakefield continued north to Kaipara. On 15 February 1840 he translated Deeds of Sale and obtained 72 signatures to formalise the purchase of a vast area of Taranaki, extending from Mokau to Cape Egmont and inland to the upper reaches of the Whanganui River. Payment was made with guns, blankets and other chattels.

J. Houston, writing in Maori Life in Old Taranaki (1965), observed: "Many of the true owners were absent, while others had not returned from slavery to the Waikatos [sic] in the north. Thus the 72 chiefs of Ngamotu cheerfully sold lands in which they themselves had no interest, as well as lands wherein they held only a part interest along with several others."

The Maori were not aided in their understanding of the deal by Barrett's translation skills. In the Land Commission hearings at Wellington in 1843, when asked to translate a lengthy land sale deed into Maori to demonstrate his abilities, he "turned a 1600-word document, written in English, into 115 meaningless Maori ones".

== Mediator and settler ==
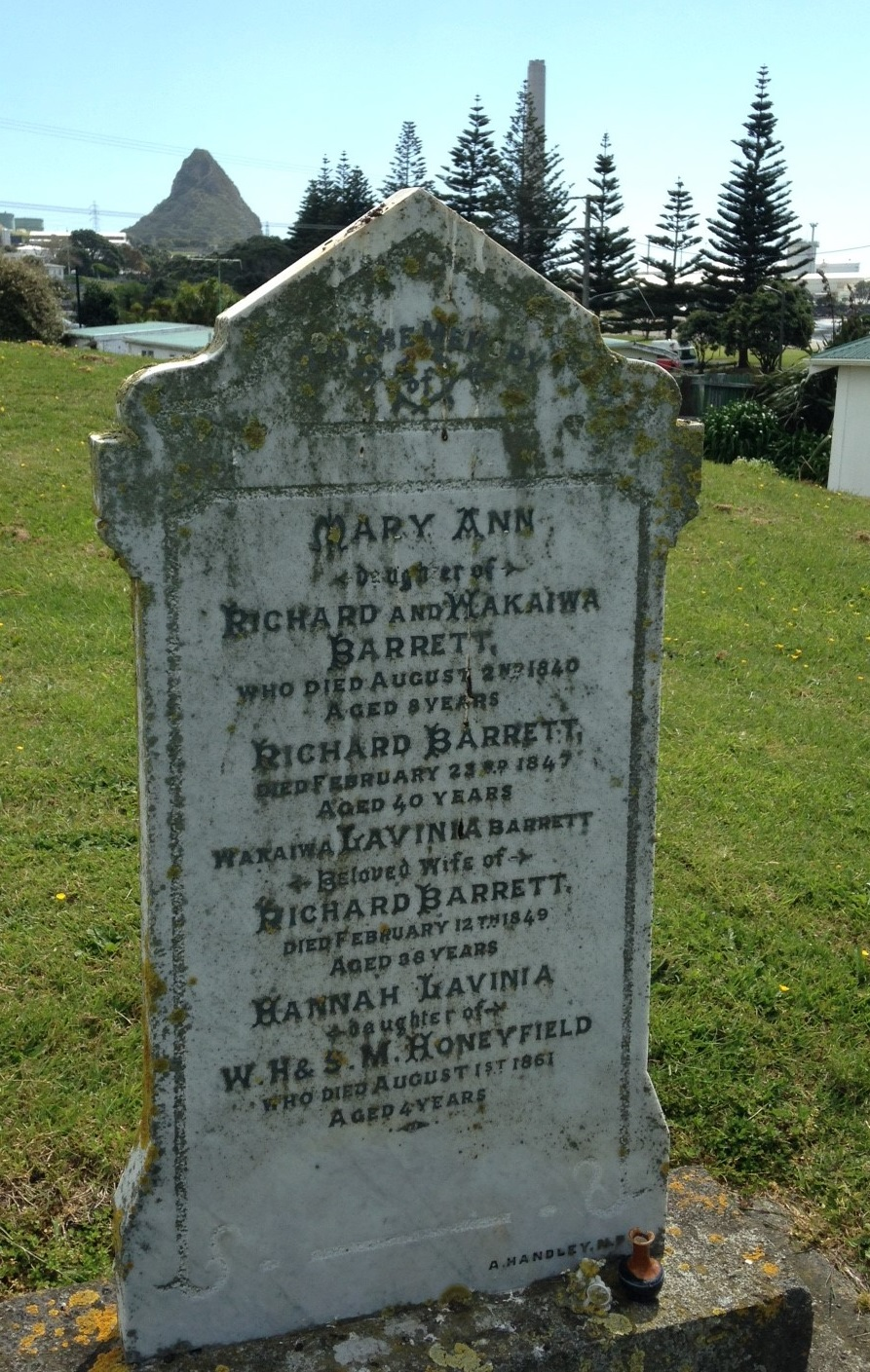
Dicky Barrett's grave in Lower Bayly Rd, Ngamotu, New Plymouth.

Barrett moved to Wellington to open a hotel and in early 1840 was appointed Agent for the Natives by Wakefield, who said the role "will make him the medium between the settlers and their dark neighbours in all disputes and in the allotment of the native reserves in lieu of the land now occupied and cultivated by them". The position was rewarded with a £100 a year salary and Barrett received glowing praise from Wakefield for his loyalty and success as well as his interpreting skills.

In 1841 he returned to New Plymouth with Frederic Alonzo Carrington, a surveyor commissioned by the New Zealand Company, who began surveying the planned town. He married Rawinia the same year, describing himself on the marriage certificate as "a whaling master of full age".

Barrett remained in New Plymouth as the settlement grew, establishing a commercially unsuccessful whaling station and serving as an unofficial harbour master, helping immigrants ashore as ships arrived. He also became a gardener and farmer. He drove the first cattle and sheep to Taranaki from Wellington and introduced a wide variety of new crops and vegetables. He missed the landing of the first settlers, who arrived on the William Bryan in March 1841, because he was about 10 km inland, searching for peach trees he had earlier planted.

When the Land Claims Commission held hearings in New Plymouth into disputed land purchases in 1844, it awarded the New Zealand Company 24,000ha of "legitimately purchased" land, including 72ha for Barrett and his family.

== Fall from favour ==
From 1842 Barrett became a persona non grata and was ostracised after being blamed by Atiawa Māori and settlers alike – as well as Governor Robert FitzRoy – for contributing to tension over settlement of Māori land with his initial negotiations. The tension later spilled over into war.

Barrett died in 1847, possibly as the result of a heart attack. Claims that he suffered fatal injuries while killing a whale off the coast of New Plymouth, reported by the Taranaki Herald in 1941, are not supported by any contemporary evidence. He was buried at Wahitapu Cemetery off lower Bayly Rd, New Plymouth. A headstone shows he is buried with his wife and eight-year-old daughter.

His legacy remains in New Plymouth with Barrett Lagoon, Barrett Reef, Barrett Domain, Barrett Road and Barrett Street, location of the former Barrett Street Hospital. Barrett Reef, in Wellington Harbour, was also named after him.

For more information, see New Plymouth.
