= Karira =

New Zealand policeman

Karira (–1867) was a New Zealand policeman. He was famous as a very early Māori policeman in the colonial force. In 1852, Karari negotiated with Donald McLean the sale of Maori-owned land near New Plymouth. Subsequently, he was recruited in the New Ulster Armed Police Force, the third Maori policeman in history. He resigned in December 1856 over changes in work conditions. Karira was reinstated a month later and was promoted in 1864 to Sergeant in charge of the Taranaki Native Police Force. He served until his death in 1867.
