= New Zealand Company ships =

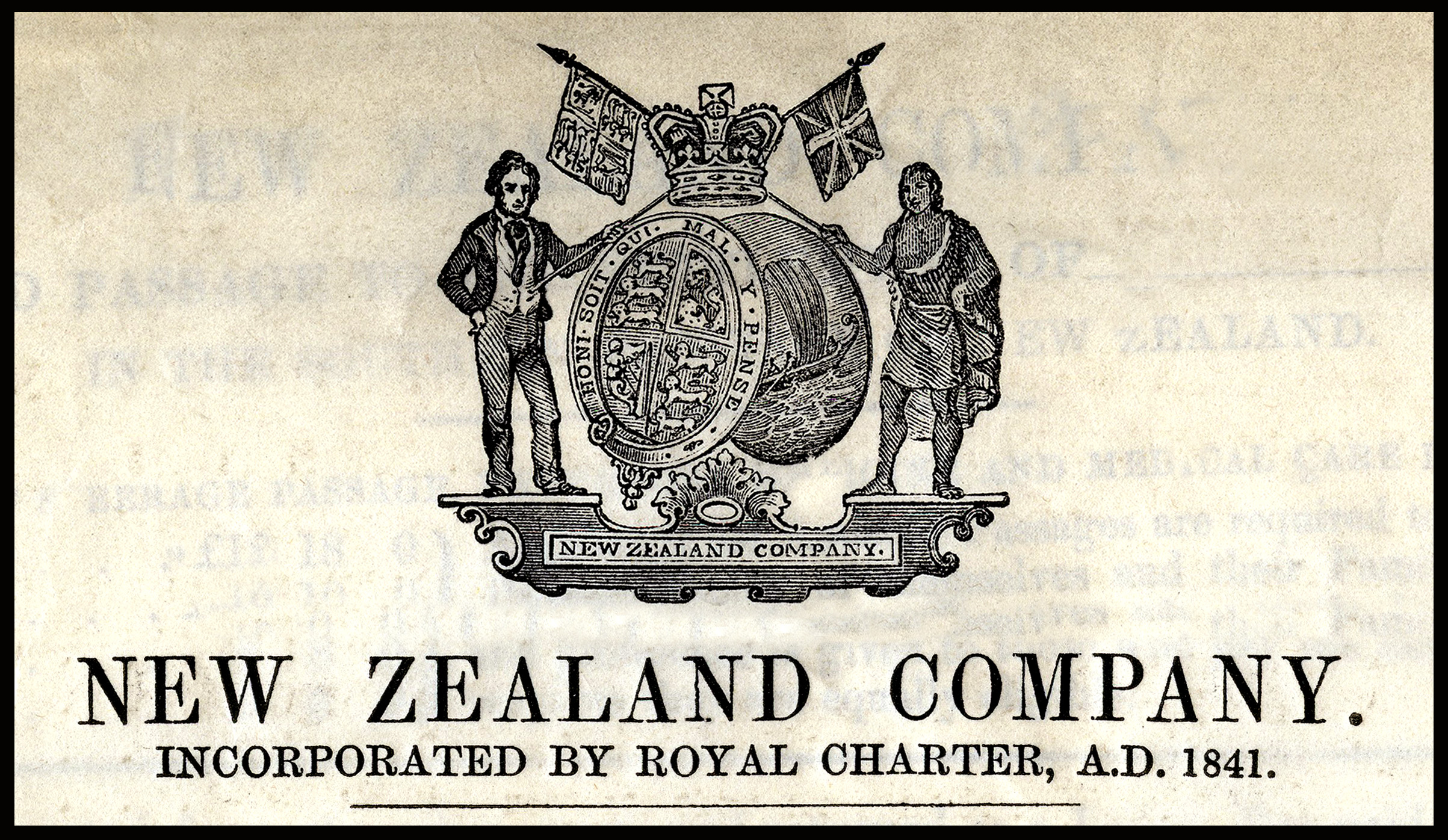
New Zealand Company Coat of Arms

The New Zealand Company was a 19th-century English company that played a key role in the colonisation of New Zealand. The company was formed to carry out the principles of systematic colonisation devised by Edward Gibbon Wakefield, who envisaged the creation of a new-model English society in the southern hemisphere. Under Wakefield's model, the colony would attract capitalists who would then have a ready supply of labour—migrant labourers who could not initially afford to be property owners, but who would have the expectation of one day buying land with their savings.

The New Zealand Company established settlements at Wellington, Nelson, Wanganui and Dunedin and also became involved in the settling of New Plymouth and Christchurch. It reached the peak of efficiency about 1841, encountered financial problems from 1843 from which it never recovered, and wound up in 1858.

This list details the various ships used by the Company in establishing its settlements in New Zealand at Wellington, Nelson, and New Plymouth up to 1843.

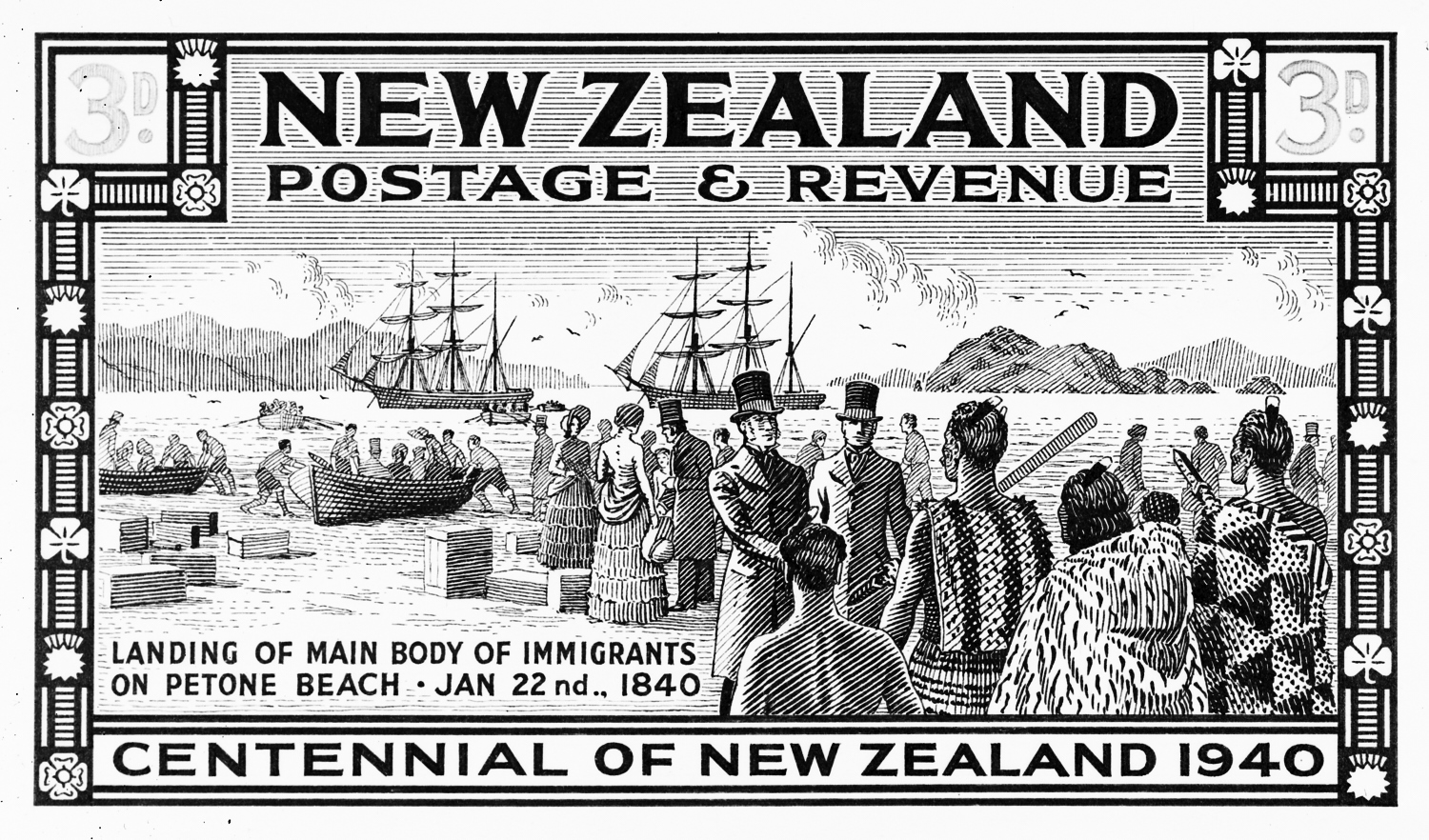
First settlers arriving at Petone, Wellington Harbour

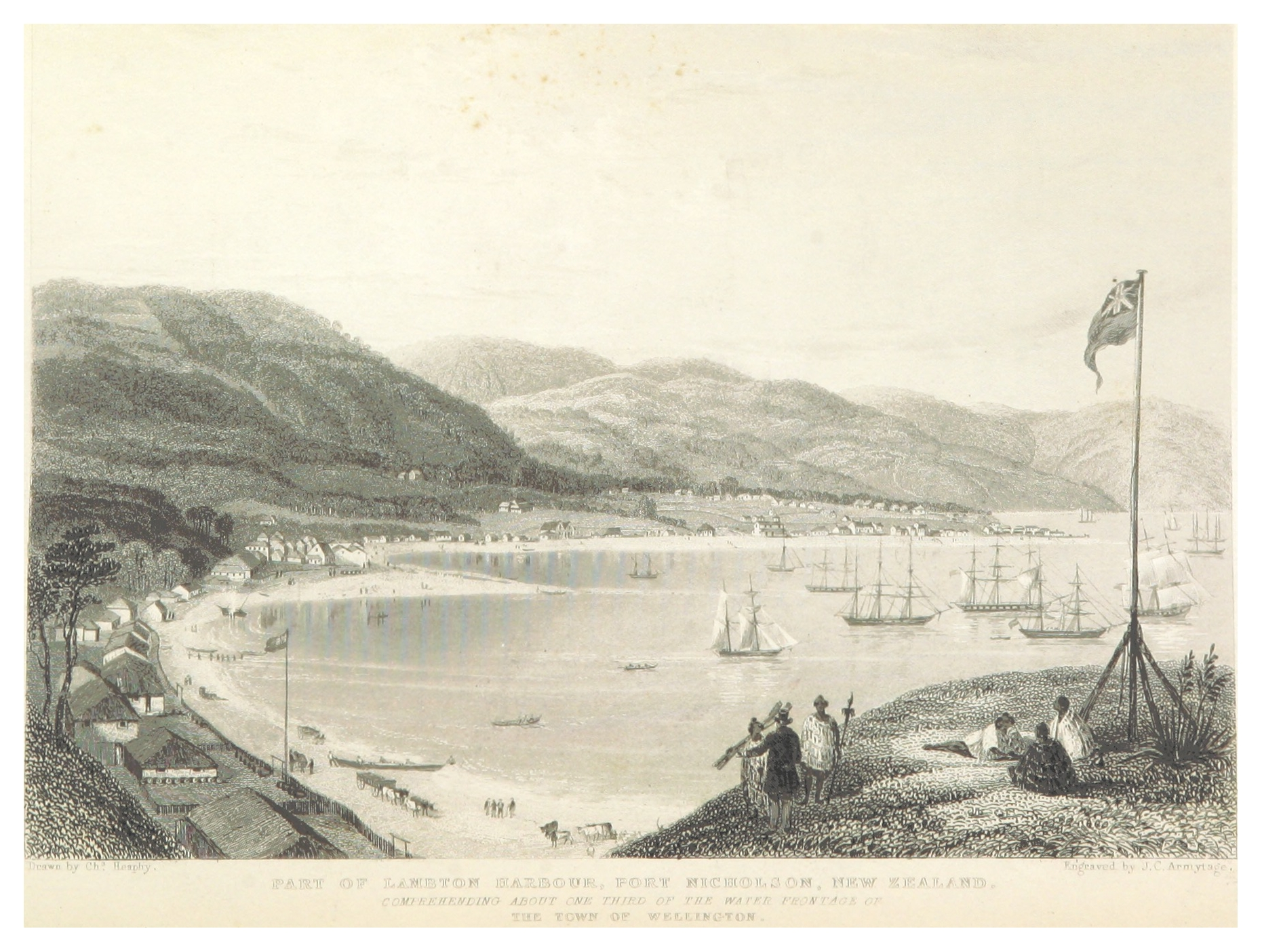
Port Nicholson Harbour in the early 1840s

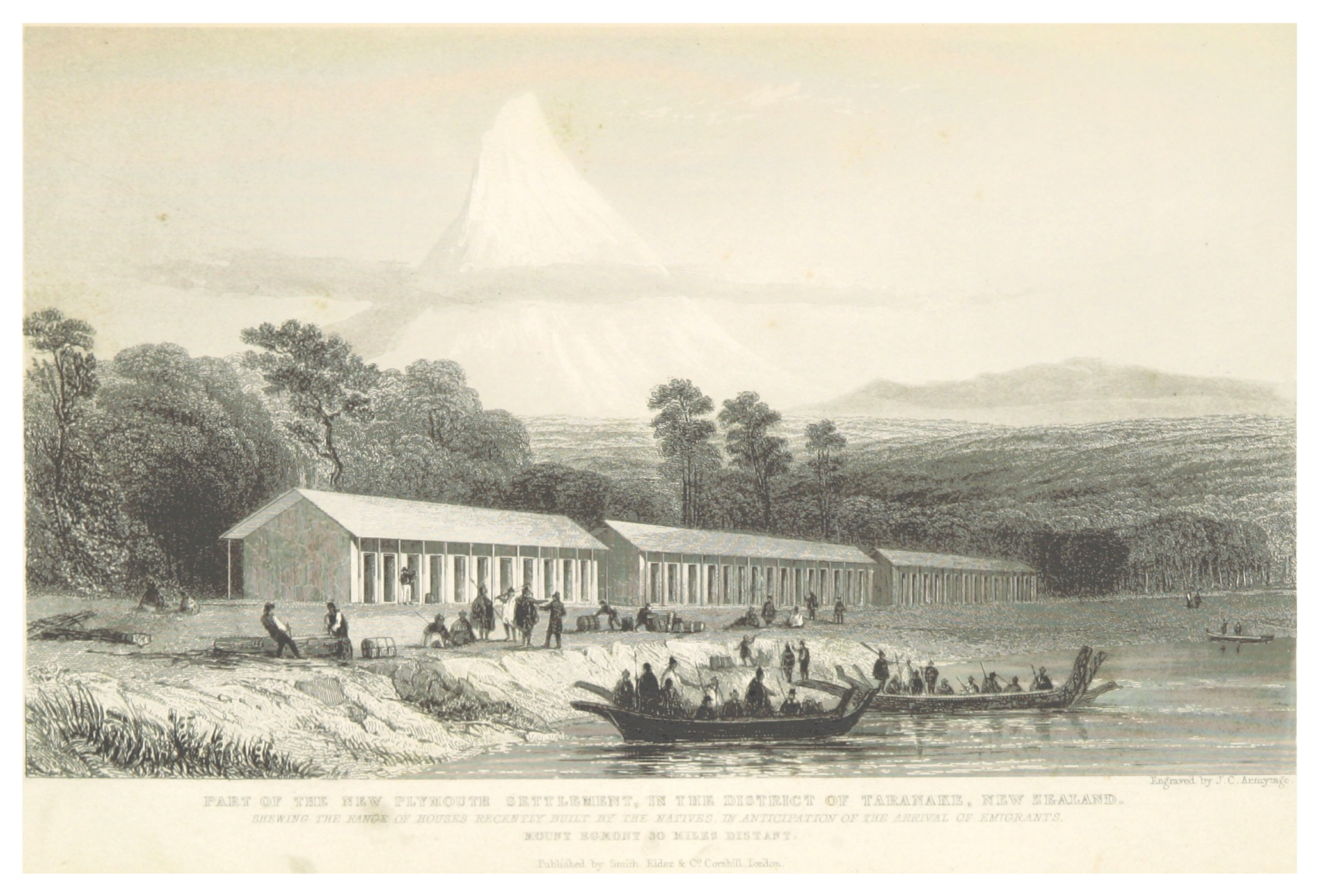
New Plymouth in 1842

== Adelaide ==
The Adelaide was a 640-ton teak sailing ship built in Calcutta in 1832. The owner was Joseph Somes of London. In 1839 it sailed to New Zealand under Captain William Campbell. It was among a group of ships carrying settlers which were to rendezvous at Port Hardy on d'Urville Island on 10 January 1840. They were sent after the Oriental. The others in the group were the Aurora, Duke of Roxburgh, and Bengal Merchant, plus a freight vessel, the Glenbervie. At the rendezvous they were told of their final destination. The Adelaide had 176 settlers on board. She sailed from London on 18 September 1839 and arrived at Port Nicholson on 7 March 1840. She arrived at about 4pm in the company of the Tory and Glenbervie.

She made three voyages bringing convicts arriving on 8 August 1849 (300 to Port Phillip, Tasmania), 16 April 1855 (260 to Western Australia), and 13 May 1863 (210 to Gibraltar, Australia).

== Amelia Thompson ==
The Amelia Thompson was a 477-ton copper sheathed barque built by Philip Laing Esq. at Deptford, Sunderland in 1833 and owned by J Pirie of London. She was named after the wife and daughter of Alderman Thompson.

On 25 April 1836 the Amelia Thompson sailed from London for Launceston, Tasmania with 172 immigrants, a large number of which were single females. She sailed to Sydney in 1838.

She sailed for Wellington under Captain William Dawson on 25 March 1841, stopping at Bahia (Salvador), Brazil on the way. Subsequently she sailed for New Plymouth and arrived on 3 September 1841 becoming the second immigrant ship there. She sat off shore for five weeks because the captain feared Ngamotu's reputation as a dangerous shipping area. Her 187 passengers were taken ashore by Dicky Barrett and his men over the course of two weeks, each small boatload taking five hours to row from the vessel to the shore. The ship's precious food cargo, including flour and salted meat, was finally brought ashore for New Plymouth's starving residents on 30 September.

On 4 December 1841 she sailed from Wellington for China. Some time later, while at Batavia to have her bottom cleaned, Captain Dawson found her back was broken. On returning to London he was told by the insurance agent it had broken when she was being launched. In 1842 the Amelia Thompson was engaged as a transport during First Opium War.

The Amelia Thompson sank on the morning of 23 May 1843 while sailing from Australia. She was about 80 miles east by south of Madras. She had been thrown on to her beam ends by a heavy squall. Seven seamen were drowned; Captain Dawson and the remaining crew members were rescued after 2 days.

== Arab ==
The Arab was a 485-ton copper sheathed ship (originally 415-ton) built at Stockton in 1840 and owned by J Irving.

She was engaged in 1841 by the New Zealand Company to sail to Port Nicholson from Cornhill on 1 June, London on 3 June, and Dartmouth on 15 June under Captain John Summers. She arrived at Port Nicholson on 16 October with 200 settlers. She left Port Nicholson in either December 1841 or January 1842.

In 1844 to 1846 the Arab was engaged on the London – Bombay route under Captain G Forster.

She may have been lost in a storm on 26 August 1847 in the Indian Ocean south of Indonesia and west of Australia at latitude 16 south longitude 99 east.

== Arrow ==
The Arrow was a 212-ton snow-brig built at Stockton in 1840 and owned by J Irvine.

Hired by the New Zealand Company as store ship. she arrived at Tasman Bay in October 1841 with the Whitby and Will Watch as part of the expedition to survey a second settlement for the Company at Nelson. On 1 November 1841 she was also the first sailing ship to enter Nelson harbour. Arrow Rock located by the old harbour entrance and south of Haulashore Island is named after her.

She had sailed to New Zealand under Captain Geare on 27 May 1841 from The Downs, England. Arriving at Port Nicholson, Wellington on 28 August after a 93-day journey, she was described as having made the fastest voyage at that time. She also brought the first news of the death of the United States President General William Henry Harrison to the colony. After participating in the exploration and survey of Nelson she returned to Wellington on 23 November and then sailed to Sydney.

According to Lloyds register she was restored in 1853 and owned by Hendry & Co. H Silvers was her master. By 1867 she was still in existence in London owned by Brenan and mastered by T Peake.

== Aurora ==
Aurora sailed for New Zealand in 1839 under Captain Theophilus Heale. She was among a group of ships carrying settlers that were to rendezvous at Port Hardy on Durville Island on 10 January 1840. They were sent after Oriental. The others in the group were Adelaide, Duke of Roxburgh, and Bengal Merchant, plus a freight vessel, Glenbervie. At the rendezvous they were told of their final destination. Aurora was carrying 148 settlers.

She was the first sailing ship wrecked while trying to leave Kaipara Harbour in April 1840. She was carrying a load of kauri spars, and the mail from Wellington for England.

== Balley ==
The Balley was a 161-ton a single deck schooner built at Shoreham by James Britton Balley in 1832. Her home port was Derry from 1834 to 1838 and London from 1841 to 1843.

She sailed the London to Terceira route under Captain F Orfeur from 1832 to 1835 and Liverpool Naples from 1836 to 1839.

On 23 December 1840 she sailed under Captain Sinclair from London to Wellington, arriving on 21 July 1841. She sailed from Wellington to Napier arriving back in Wellington on 6 November 1841 with cargo.

In 1843 she sailed from London to Africa under Captain Foster and from London to Cape of Good Hope in 1850 under Captain J Laws.

== Bella Marina ==
The Bella Marina was a 564-ton (originally 480 ton) frigate built sailing ship built in 1840 at Maryport with a yellow metal hull installed in 1847.

She sailed under Captain Thomas Ashbridge from Gravesend on 26 January 1844 for Wellington, Nelson and New Plymouth. She arrived at New Plymouth via Hobart on 27 May and Wellington on 31 May. She stopped at Hobart to drop off the Catholic Bishop for Tasmania, Bishop Wilson.

At the time of her arrival in Port Nicholson, the New Zealand Company was in serious financial trouble. At Nelson 100 of its employees had been made redundant and trade in Port Nicholson was severely depressed. The impact meant that there were more people trying to leave than she could take. She returned to England, arriving on 30 January 1845, having sailed from Port Nicholson on 15 October fully laden with a cargo of 385 tons whale oil and 19 tons of bones. Among the cargo was an experimental shipment of staves and furniture woods, which it was hoped would provide another source of revenue for the colony.

In 1845 she sailed for Bombay under Ashbridge.

In 1849 she was on the Liverpool – Calcutta route under Captain Wood. In 1857 she was reported as sailing from Liverpool to Galle where she arrived on 28 September.

There was a 1000-ton clipper ship named Bella Marina under Captain Henry Elliot that sailed in New Zealand and Australian waters in the 1860s. Whether this was a refurbished version of the previous or advertising puffery is unknown. The advertisement referred to her as being so long and favourably known of these (Australian) coasts. In 1862 she was at San Francisco and sailed to Australia via Puget Sound, arriving at Port Phillip on 24 August. The Argus, Melbourne referred to her as being 564 tons when she departed for Otago on 16 September as did other publications.

She returned to Australia in November, en route to California. Instead she sailed for Wellington on 15 December with 700 tons of coal. From there she sailed to San Francisco, arriving on 24 March 1863. She then sailed to Puget Sound to pick up a cargo of timber for New Zealand, arriving at Port Phillip, Australia from Vancouver Island, Canada on 6 December with 330,000 feet of timber.

While at Melbourne, she was advertised for sale. On 9 March 1864 she sailed from Sydney to Auckland arriving on 26 March under Elliot with 188 passengers, mainly for the Waikato. Unable to obtain cargo at Auckland she became a coal hulk in June. From 1879 she was owned by the Bay of Islands Coal Company Limited. She was broken up at Drunken Bay, Browns Island by David Gouk of North Shore in 1896.

== Bengal Merchant ==
Bengal Merchant was a 503-ton sailing ship under Captain John Hemery. It was among a group of ships carrying settlers which were to rendezvous at Port Hardy on Durville Island on 10 January 1840. They were sent after the Oriental. The others in the group were Aurora, Duke of Roxburgh and Adelaide, plus the freight vessel Glenbervie. At the rendezvous they were told of their final destination. Bengal Merchant was carrying 160 settlers.

== Birman ==
The Birman was a 545 barque sheathed with yellow metal built at Westburn, Greenock by John Scott & Sons in 1840. Her yard number was 131 and she was launched on 2 July 1840 for A & G Adam and J Ballantine of Greenock.

The Birman was in Adelaide in 1840 and sailed for Calcutta under Captain John Clelland. On 13 October 1841 she sailed under Clelland from Gravesend arriving at Port Nicholson via Cape of Good Hope on 1 March 1842 with 243 settlers. She sailed for Calcutta on 31 March.

She was sailing between England and Singapore in the late 1840s and 1851. Her master was given as John Guthrie in 1845. In 1851 and 1852 she sailed from Clyde to North America. Her 1851 voyage was from Greenock in July to Quebec, arriving 22 Aug 1851 with settlers from Tiree. These journeys were followed on 2 October 1852 from Glasgow to Melbourne, arriving on 21 January 1853. She sailed for Singapore on 25 February under Captain J Brown.

She was believed to have been condemned in 1855.

== Blenheim ==
Blenheim was a 375-ton barque built at Jarrow in 1834 and owned by Brown and Co of London. She sailed to Wellington under Captain J Brown in 1840 with 197 settlers. Sailed from Plymouth on 2 July 1842 under Captain John Gray to New Plymouth with 159 settlers, arriving on 19 November 1842, having called in at Wellington.

== Bolton ==
Bolton was a 541-ton barque built at Liverpool in 1822 and owned by T Oldfield of London. It sailed from London on 1 November 1839 under Captain J P Robinson with 323 settlers for Wellington. It arrived at Port Nicholson on 21 April 1840. Bolton returned to Nelson, New Zealand on 28 February 1842 with more settlers.

In 1849 Bolton sailed from London and Plymouth to Adelaide under Captain J F Young, arriving on 29 November.

On 23 June 1853 Bolton arrived at Port Jackson, New South Wales having sailed from Plymouth on 23 February.

== Bombay ==
Bombay was launched in 1801 at Daman/Demaun. Her early career is obscure. In 1842 she carried settlers for the New Zealand Company. She sailed under Captain James Moore from Deptford on 30 July 1842 and Gravesend on 1 August 1842 for Wellington and Nelson. She arrived at Nelson on 14 December 1842 with 134 settlers.

== Brougham ==
Brougham was a 227-ton (also listed as 238 ton) copper (in 1844 yellow metal) sheathed teak built barque built at Calcutta in 1820 by Boreen and Co. She was lengthened in 1832.

In 1836 she brought a load of cargo under Captain Viles via Mauritius and Hobart to Sydney. At Sydney she was put up for sale and refitted. She then spent time sailing in Australian waters until sailing from Hobart on 11 December 1838 under Captain John Cameron to London.

Under Captain Kettlewell, she brought 5 settlers to Wellington on 25 June 1840. Wakefield used the Brougham to sail to the Bay of Islands to try to persuade Governor Hobson to relocate New Zealand's capital from Russell to Wellington. He was unsuccessful and Hobson chose Auckland instead. The Brougham returned to Wellington on 16 August 1840. She remained in New Zealand waters until 5 May 1841 when she returned to London with the first export cargo from the area. A shipment of oil and whalebone. While in Wellington Harbour she assisted New Zealand Company settlers move their belongings from Petone to Wellington.

Brougham made a second trip leaving London later in 1841 under Captain Robinson (or Robertson). On her voyage, going through the French Pass, she had been swept on an unmarked shoal by the tide and almost tipped onto her beam on a ledge. She was refloated without damage and reached Nelson in safety arriving on 9 February 1842. She went from there to New Plymouth and back to Wellington on 28 March. After a further return journey to New Plymouth from Wellington she sailed for Valparaiso on 4 June. She remained sailing between Wellington, Valparaiso, and Nelson until November 1843 when she returned to England.

In March 1843 Brougham collided with the schooner Ocean while sailing from Wellington. Brougham did not suffer any significant damage, but Ocean had to put back for repairs.

Brougham was converted to a whaling barque. She was reported in 1844 near the Solomon Island and again in 1849 in the Timor Strait. She also carried whale oil and other cargo to London.

Brougham still appeared in Lloyd's Register in 1860 with Robinson, owner, and Captain Mills, master.

== Clifford ==
Clifford was a 528-ton (originally 461 ton) sailing ship built at Maryport in 1840 and copper sheathed owned by Sharp & Co of Liverpool.

She sailed under Captain Joseph Sharp with 148 settlers from Gravesend on 18 December 1841 via Wellington for Nelson, arriving 11 May 1842. She left for Java and India via Sydney on 22 June. While sailing for Sydney she passed the Brougham. At Sydney she took on water and sought to sail with another ship through Torres Strait. Clifford was sailing in the company of Isabella when she struck a reef in Torres Strait on 16 August and sank. No people died and the crew was rescued by Isabella.

== Clifton ==
Clifton was an 867-ton (previously 697-ton and also described as 579- and 820-ton in some sources) frigate 1837 Indiaman built by Green Shipbuilders at Bristol and owned by J & F Somes of London.

She sailed under Captain James A Cox from Gravesend on 2 October 1841, calling at the Isle of Wight, on 3 to Port Nicholson, arriving 17 February 1842.

She sailed for New Zealand and Hong Kong on 5 July 1847 under Cox. She arrived at Auckland under Captain George Kettlewell on 26 January 1848 and sailed for Hong Kong on 28 February.

On 2 October 1849 she sailed from London under Captain E W Beazley for Sydney and Port Phillip, arriving at Port Phillip on 12 February 1850 with 220 passengers. On 11 December 1852 she sailed from Sydney for London,

She was in Ipswich, Queensland on 11 April 1862 having arrived from Plymouth under Captain John F D'Oyley on 8 April with 214 passengers.

== Coromandel ==
Coromandel was a 662-ton sailing ship. In 1840, under Captain French, she brought 44 settlers to Wellington.

== Cuba ==
Cuba was a 273-ton (or 272-ton in some sources) ship built at Liverpool in 1824 and owned by J Somes of London. She sailed with a surveyors' team headed by Captain William Mein Smith, R.A. on 15 September 1839 for New Zealand. She was followed from Gravesend, London, by Oriental, the first of five 500-ton immigrant ships hired by the company. She returned to England in early 1840.

In September 1840 she was in Sydney under Captain Newcombe with a cargo of gunpowder. She then sailed for Port Nicholson on 7 November. Through to 1844 she regularly sailed between London and Sydney.

== Duke of Roxburgh ==
Duke of Roxburgh was a 417-ton sailing ship under Captain James Thomson. She was among a group of ships carrying settlers that were to rendezvous at Port Hardy on Durville Island on 10 January 1840. They were sent after Oriental. The other vessels in the group were Adelaide, Aurora, and Bengal Merchant, plus a freight vessel, Glenbervie. At the rendezvous they were told of their final destination. Duke of Roxburgh was carrying 167 settlers. George Hunter, Wellington's first mayor was one of the settlers.

== Eden ==
Eden was a 513 ton barque owned by John Luscombe and chartered by the New Zealand Company in 1850 to transport 143 settlers to New Zealand. Under Captain Alexander Murdoch she sailed from Gravesend on 3 June 1850, departing The Downs on 8 June and arriving in New Plymouth on 29 October. She then sailed on to Nelson (arriving on 6 November), then to Port Nicolson (arriving on 18 November), and finally to Port Chalmers (arriving on 27 December). Eden was the last ship to bring settlers to New Zealand for the New Zealand Company.

== Essex ==
Essex, a 305-ton barque (originally 288 ton; 329 tons in some sources) built at Sunderland in 1840 and owned by Soames of London. She sailed under Captain Henry Oakley and arrived in New Plymouth with 115 settlers on 25 January 1843. New Plymouth at the time was described as a collection of raupo and pitsawn timber huts housing almost 1000 Europeans.

She returned to Australia in 1843 and sailed for Lombok from Sydney. She was again in Australia, having sailed from London with cargo, in 1847 and 1850.

== Fifeshire ==
Fifeshire was a 587-ton bargue built a Sunderland in 1841 with a yellow metal covered hull. Her owner was J Pirie of London. Under Captain Arnold, she sailed from West India Dock, London on 26 September 1841. It was one of four ships hired by the New Zealand Company in 1841. The others were Lord Auckland under Captain Jardine, Mary Ann under Captain Bolton, and Lloyds under Captain Green. Fifeshire was the first to arrive on 1 February 1842. It ran aground and was wrecked on Arrow Rock while leaving Nelson.

== George Fyfe ==
George Fyfe was a 444-ton (originally 436 tons. 460 tons in some sources) yellow metal sheathed barque built at Leith in 1839 and owned by Small & Co.

On her maiden voyage under Captain George Pyke, she sailed from Tobermorey to Sydney, arriving at Sydney on 24 January 1840 with 178 immigrants. Pyke sailed again from London via Plymouth on 24 March 1841 arriving at Melbourne on 23 July 1841. Pyke sailed from London again on 16 June 1842, arriving at Wellington on 7 November and Nelson on 12 December. In the later 1840s she sailed from London to Bombay.

On 17 February 1855 she sailed under Captain A Rattray from Dundee to Hobsons Bay, arriving on 14 July.

== Gertrude ==
Gertrude was a 560-ton copper sheathed ship (originally 453 ton) built at Sunderland in 1841 and owned by Ingham & Co. In 1845 she was changed to 703 tons with yellow metal sheathing. She sailed from Liverpool to Calcutta.

In 1841 under Captain Thomas Fisher (or T F) Stead RN she was chartered by the New Zealand Company to bring settlers to Port Nicholson. She arrived in Port Nicholson on 30 October 1841 having sailed from Gravesend on 19 June 1841. One of her passengers was John Plimmer, known as the father of Wellington. Stead, a Lieutenant in the Royal Navy, had been the master of the convict ship Asia and had sailed to at least six times between 1822 and 1836.

She sailed to Port Phillip and then to Calcutta on 5 December. She was in Singapore at the beginning of January 1843 and sailed for Madras on 4 January.

On 6 December 1845 there was a report from the ship Queen that she had sighted and spoken to a barque named Gertrude at 31°08′S 87°18′E in the Indian Ocean almost midway between Australia and Africa. She was hoved to with her mizen top sail to the mast. The person on board identified themselves as the captain and stated that two days earlier she had been holed. She was taking on water and sinking. He was going to abandon her. Asked if he needed assistance he said no. His crew was now on a nearby Danish ship and he was going to join them. Whether this was the same Gertrude is unknown, but she did not appear in Lloyds Register after 1847.

== Glenbervie ==
Glenbervie sailed for New Zealand in 1839 under Captain William Black. It was among a group of ships carrying settlers which were to rendezvous at Port Hardy on Durville Island on 10 January 1840. They were sent after the Oriental. The others in the group were the Adelaide, Aurora, Bengal Merchant and Duke of Roxburgh. The Glenbervie sailed from London on 2 October 1839 as a store ship. At the rendezvous they were told of their final destination. She arrived at Port Nicholson on 7 March 1840 at about 4pm in the company of Tory and Adelaide. Glenbervie was carrying the Manager, Clerks, and well-lined safe that was used to set up a branch of the Union Bank of Australia, New Zealand's first bank. In total she carried seven settlers.

== Guide ==
The Guide was a short-term charter by William Wakefield. It was a 147-ton teak-built Calcutta pilot brig under Captain John J Peacock. Wakefield sailed Guide from the Bay of Islands to meet the New Zealand Company ships rendezvousing at Port Hardy on 10 January 1840. The Guide was wrecked in January 1846 near Whakapuaka Pa.

== Indus ==
The Indus was a 423-ton (originally 351 ton) sailing ship with copper sheathing built at Dundee in 1838 and owned by Clark of Dundee.

In April 1841 the Indus was in Sydney.

Under Captain David McKenzie she sailed from Gravesend on 1 October 1842 and arrived at Nelson on 5 February 1843.

In January 1850 the Indus was in Sydney under Captain Frank Putt.

== Katherine Stewart Forbes ==
The Katherine Stewart Forbes, a 457-ton sailing ship under Captain John Hobbs, left Gravesend on 5 February 1841 and arrived at Port Nicholson on 24 June with 176 emigrants.

== Lady Nugent ==
Lady Nugent, chartered by the New Zealand Company, sailed for Wellington in 1840 under Captain Santry.

On 30 May 1851 she sailed from London to Lyttelton under Captain John Parsons with Canterbury Association settlers, arriving on 18 September. She then sailed to Nelson, reaching there on 23 October.

== Lambton ==
The Lambton was a 62-ton cutter owned by James Corlette of Port Stephens (New South Wales). Corlette had used the cutter since 1816 to ship timber and wool out of the port.

The New Zealand Company hired her and dispatched her to New Zealand in 1825 under Captain James Herd's expedition. Along with Rosanna, Lambton's role was to explore trade prospects and potential settlement sites in New Zealand. On 5 March 1826 the ships reached Stewart Island, which Herd explored and then dismissed as a possible settlement, before sailing north to inspect land around Otago Harbour.

Lambton returned to Australia in March 1827. There, Corlette sailed her between Sydney and Port Stephens under the auspices of the Australian Agricultural Company.

Lambton was put up for sale at Hobart and then Sydney in 1835. In 1837 she was reported as having rescued the survivors of the English whaler Falcon which had been wrecked on Ascension Island in the Caroline Islands group. A local chief's son called Narnewah had attacked the whaler, killing some of her crew. Lambton, under Captain C Hart, had arrived on 12 August and along with the schooner Unity took them to Guam. The full narrative of the Narnewah incident was published in the Sydney Gazette and New South Wales Advertiser in 1840.

== Lloyds ==
The 403-ton 3-mast barque built at Deptford, Kent in 1830 by T Ward and J B Stone and owned by J Brown of Poole. The Lloyds under Captain William Green, was one of four ships hired by the New Zealand Company to bring settlers to Nelson in 1841. The others were the Fireshire, Lord Auckland and Mary Ann. The Lloyds sailed from Gravesend on 11 September 1841. All the ships arrived in Nelson in 1841. When the Lloyds came into Nelson, it brought with it many stories of sickness and death. While travelling the seas between Port Gravesend in England and Port Nicholson in New Zealand, 67 children under the age of 14 died due to an outbreak of whooping cough on board. Many at the time blamed the surgeon on the Lloyds. Dr George F. Bush was the surgeon aboard the Lloyds. He was 37 at the time and came from Bristol and was well known among the New Zealand Company Directors. Dr Bush should have made sure that all of the ship's food requirements went on board. However, a comparison between the "Reeves List" (the list made by the Inspector for Shipping in England) and the actual ship's list of food shows that they did not have sufficient quantities of basic provisions. Nor was this the only problem. Apart from the doctor and his wife, the Lloyds was a women-and-children-only vessel, the husbands, fathers, and other males having emigrated over 4 months earlier on the Whitby, to prepare the settlement. But the crew, of course, were men. There was a public enquiry which looked not only at hygiene and rationing, but at the behaviour of the crew (and some of the women).

In 1833, 1837, and 1845 the Lloyds brought convicts to New South Wales and Tasmania.

The Lloyds had sailed to Sydney in 1835 under Edward Garrett, RN, arriving with cargo on 2 November. She was again in Australia in 1838 and reported as sailing for Madras from Adelaide in 1839. In June 1850, under Captain Pearson, she brought assisted immigrants to Sydney, This was her last journey as she was lost in Torres Strait on 26 August 1850 while bound from Sydney to Manila. One crew member was lost, with the others reaching Surabaya on 12 September.

== London ==
London was a 612-ton (bm) sailing ship built at London in 1832. She made two voyages to New Zealand with immigrants and passengers, one in 1840 under Captain Henry Shuttleworth, and one in 1842 under Captain Joseph Thomas Attwood.

== Lord Auckland ==
Lord Auckland, was a 628-ton teak barque built at Calcutta in 1834, where she was originally 480 tons. She was owned by Brown and Co of London and sailed to New Zealand in 1841 under Captain Jardine. She was one of four ships hired by the New Zealand Company in 1841 to bring settlers to Nelson. The others were Fifeshire, under Captain Arnold, Mary Ann, under Captain Bolton, and Lloyds, under Captain Green. Lord Auckland sailed from West India Dock, London on 25 September 1841.

In January 1847 under Captain Robert Brown Lord Auckland sailed from Sydney to found a new settlement at Port Curtis in Queensland. She grounded on the flats at the entrance to Port Curtis on 25 January 1847. Three days later she managed to get but had been severely damaged. Shipwrights were bought from Sydney on the cutter George to repair her sufficiently to return to Sydney for more substantial reports. She had a second grounding on 21 April 1849, when bound from Hobart to India with horses. She ran aground on Turtle Island (Newcastle Bay). Fortunately the spring tide enabled her to refloat and although damaged was able to make the voyage.

Lord Auckland made four voyages to Australia as a convict ship. These were in 1844, 1846, 1848, and 1852. On her last voyage she was under Captain George Thompson and carried 248 male convicts from Cork, Ireland on 29 September 1852 and to Hobart, arriving on 29 January 1853.

== Lord William Bentinck ==
Lord William Bentinck made numerous voyages: she transported convicts to Tasmania, laborers from Madras to Trinidad, and immigrants to New Zealand before she wrecked on a voyage to Valparaiso c.1859.

== Martha Ridgway ==
The Martha Ridgway was a 621-ton sailing ship built at Liverpool in 1840 and owned by Ridgway of Liverpool. She sailed to New Zealand under Captain Bisset. It was wrecked in 1842 near the site of the Raine Island Beacon, Queensland, Australia. Timber from the ship was used in construction of the Beacon.

== Mary Anne ==
The Mary Anne was a 587-ton ship with a yellow metal hull built in Calcutta in 1817 and owned by R Brown.

In 1829 she sailed from Calcutta to Valparaiso via Hobart. Sopped at Hobart on 17 March 1830. She returned via Sydney with a cargo of wheat She made various trips around the Pacific to different ports including Canton in 1835. Her main ports of call were in Australia. In 1838 she sailed under Captain Thomas Bolton from Sydney to London and was back in August 1840 with 243 emigrants. Leaving in Sydney on 9 October, she returned to London via Madras.

She was one of four ships hired by the New Zealand Company in 1841 to bring settlers to Nelson. The others were the Fifeshire under Captain Arnold, the Lord Auckland under Captain Jardine, and the Lloyds under Captain Green. She sailed from West India Docks, London on 29 April 1841. From Nelson the Mary Ann sailed back to Sydney arriving on 1 April 1842 and sailing on to the East Indies on 12 April.

She did not return again to Australia, but sailed between London and the United States.

== New Zealand ==
The New Zealand was a 455-ton (originally 378 ton) barque with yellow metal sheathing built a Sunderland in 1842.

She sailed from Cumray on the Clyde under Captain C H Worth that sailed on 4 July 1842 and arrived in Nelson on 4 November with 137 settlers.

== Olympus ==
The Olympus was a 316-ton barque built in 1834 at Newcastle and owned by A Ridley of London. She had yellow metal fitted to her hull in 1848.

She sailed under Captain John Whyte for Wellington on 9 December 1840, arriving on 20 April 1841 with 159 settlers.

On 13 June 1842 she sailed from Deptford under Whyte, arriving at Nelson on 28 October 1842 with 139 settlers.

In the late 1840s she brought migrants from Europe to America. In 1854 the Olympus and the Trade Wind collided. The Olympus was sailing from Liverpool for New York. Both vessels foundered. The Belgian barque Stadt Antwerpen under Captain Wyteerhoven rescued 44 from the Trade-Wind and 52 from the Olympus. Those rescued were landed at New York.

== Oriental ==
The Oriental was a 507-ton teak sailing ship built at Cochin in 1830 and owned by R Barry of London. She had a yellow metal hull installed in 1848.

Her first journey to Australia was from Liverpool to Hobart under Captain Allen, arriving on 5 September 1835. A passenger was John Bede Polding, first Catholic bishop and archbishop of Sydney, and the voyage is recorded in detail by a priest accompanying him, Lewis Harding.

Sailing under Captain William Wilson, she was the first of five 500-ton immigrant ships hired by the New Zealand Company to take settlers to Wellington in 1839. Aurora, Adelaide, Duke of Roxburgh, and Bengal Merchant, plus a freight vessel, the Glenbervie, followed, all sailing with instructions to rendezvous on 10 January 1840 at Port Hardy on D'Urville Island where they would be told of their final destination.

Oriental made six voyages to New Zealand.

In 1841 she brought more settlers to New Plymouth from London. In 1849 she brought 194 emigrants to the Cape of Good Hope. In 1850 she sailed from London to Melbourne under Captain T P Taylor, arriving on 23 September. She remained in Australian waters until 1851 when sailed to New Zealand and back under Captain Hyde. She remained in Australia in October 1852 under Captain Edward Shrewsbury and then sailed for London.

In February 1854 she returned to Melbourne under Captain C Duggan and then sailed for Callao, Peru.

In 1855 under Captain MacIntosh she brought 261 migrants to Adelaide from Southampton. She then sailed for Guam on 21 December from Adelaide On 25 July 1857 she returned to Hobart under Captain Nixon with 130 immigrants from London.

== Phoebe ==
The Phoebe was a 578-ton (originally 471 ton) barque built at Sunderland by James Laing in 1842 (rebuilt in 1844), sheathed in yellow metal, and owned by Duncan Dunbar of London.

She sailed under Captain William Dale sailed from Gravesend on 16 November 1842, arriving via Wellington at Nelson on 29 March 1843. Ernest Rutherford's grandfather and his father sailed on the Phoebe to New Zealand.

On 25 September 1844 the Phoebe sailed to Tasmania with convicts, arriving on 2 January 1845. She returned to Australia in 1846 and 1847.

Dunbar replaced the Phoebe in 1850 with the 704-ton Phoebe Duncan, also built by James Laing. The ship's figurehead was still extant in 2017 being sold by the Vallejo Gallery, 120 Tustin Ave, Newport Beach, California.

== Platina ==
The Platina was a 303-ton barque built at Sunderland by Moses Wilkinson in 1830 and owned by R Brooks of London.

The Platina made at least eight voyages to Australia: the first under Captain W S Wilson sailed from London on 25 July 1831 arriving in Hobart on 11 December; from Liverpool on 18 May 1832; on 9 April 1833 she sailed from London to Sydney via Rio de Janeiro, arriving on 10 October 1833; on 14 October 1835 from London to Sydney under Captain G H Parker; on 2 May 1837 under Captain Robson Coltish to Hobart from London with convicts; on 26 September 1838 under Captain Thomas Wellbank she sailed from London to Adelaide with 105 settlers, arriving on 9 February 1839; on 8 April 1842 from London to Melbourne; and in 1843 she sailed from Leith, Scotland to Melbourne, arriving in January 1844. It returned to London, arriving there on 7 June 1844. .

The Platina bought the disassembled paddle steamer Governor Arthur from Britain to Hobart on its 1832 voyage. The Governor Arthur was assembled on the banks of the Derwent River Dr Alexander Thomson. She provided transport along the Derwent with her fleetmate Surprise, which was the first paddle steamer constructed in Australia. In October 1833 the Governor Arthur sailed to Launceston, becoming the first steam powered vessel sail along the coast of Tasmania.

On 14 December 1833, having been unable to find cargo, she sailed to Manila. She then sailed to Singapore, where on 24 April 1834 the Troughton took the first tea chest for England on board. The Troughton fired a celebratory 7-gun salute, which the Platina answered with a 13-gun salute. The Platina left Singapore on 13 June for London but had to put into Cape of Good Hope 7 October for repairs. R Brooks of London acquired the Platina in 1834 from Potters.

In November 1836, while returning from Australia the Platina was caught by a severe storm in the North Sea. She had to cut away all of her masts to remain afloat. During her 1837 voyage to Australia she was again hit by a severe storm and was held up Cape Town for 12 days. On this same voyage she was carrying the revolving lights for the Iron Pot and Launceston Lighthouses.

In 1840 under Captain Michael Wycheley she sailed to Wellington via Hobart as a store ship for the New Zealand Company with 2 settlers. The Platina also shipped Governor Hobson's house, which the company had assumed would be erected in Wellington. While at Hobart the Platina received orders from the British Government to take the house to Auckland. Much to the annoyance of the Wellington settlers, after unloading the New Zealand Company goods at Wellington the Platina sailed for Auckland, becoming what is thought to be the first European vessel to anchor in Waitemata harbour.

The Platina was acquired by Gillespy of London in 1848 and sailed from London to Coquimbo then to Honduras up to 1854.

== Prince of Wales ==
The Prince of Wales was a 582-ton sailing ship under Captain Alexander that sailed from London on 2 September 1842 and arrived at Nelson on 31 December and Wellington on 3 January 1843.

== Prince Rupert ==
The Prince Rupert was a 322-ton barque built in 1827 and owned by the Hudson's Bay Company.

She sailed from Gravesend on 11 May 1841 under Sir Henry E Atkinson via the Isle of Wight on 11 May. On 18 July she was reported as being at Bahia where she took on fresh water. Atkinson had fallen ill and was replaced by E Ramage. Atkinson then returned to England from Bahia. Thomas Beazley was appointed First Officer as had experience sailing east of the Cape of Good Hope.

The Prince Rupert set sail on 23 July and on the journey decided to put in to Cape Town for supplies. On 4 September, off Mouille Point, while anchoring for the night she was caught by the wind on blown stern first into the rocks. Stuck fast and unable to free herself she fired her gun to attract attention. The Bucephalus, at anchor about two miles away sent a boat to assist. John R Merewether of the Bucephalus with three of his crew and Mr Frood, a passenger from the Prince Rupert, perished in the surf among the rocks when their boat was overturned. They had returned to check in case there was still anyone on the Prince Rupert.

William Spain, who was appointed in 1841 as a New Zealand Land Claims Commissioner to investigate land purchases from the Māori people by the New Zealand Company, together with his family was a passenger on the ship. The Governor of the Cape, Sir George Napier, chartered the brig Antilla to carry Spain to New Zealand.

== Regina ==
The Regina was a 174-ton copper-sheathed schooner built at Plymouth in 1841 and owned by Row and Co, London.

Chartered by the New Zealand company, she left Plymouth early in April 1841. She sailed under Captain Brouse and was the baggage ship for the Amelia Thompson. She arrived at Port Nicholson on 31 August.

After leaving Wellington on 27 September she reached New Plymouth on 3 October. Some of her cargo was land, but the weather forced her to put out to sea. On the evening of 4 November she was driven ashore. No people died. An attempt was made to refloat her but this proved futile and she became too badly damaged by pounding on the rocks. All her cargo was recovered and she was broken up for scrap.

== Rosanna ==
The Rosanna was a 260-ton copper sheathed sloop built at Stockton and owned by Soames and Co who used it for sailing from London to Bombay.

The Rosanna was acquired by the New Zealand Company. Under Captain James Herd, accompanied by the Lambton she sailed to New Zealand in 1826 with 60 prospective settlers to explore suitable sites for trade and development as settlements by the New Zealand Company. The expedition was led by Herd. On 5 March 1826 the expedition reached Stewart Island, which Herd explored and then dismissed as a possible settlement, before sailing north to inspect land around Otago Harbour. Herd charted both Port Nicholson and Port Otago.

In January 1827 Hongi Hika was shot and wounded in a minor engagement. This prompted fears for safety of the Missionaries in Northland. Herd who was at Hokianga, on hearing of this sent a letter to Henry Williams offering a passage to Sydney. Although the offer was not accepted a letter expressing their thanks was published in the Sydney paper. Less than six settlers from the Rosanna eventually settled in Hokianga under the protection of the Ngāpuhi Chief Moetara Motu Tongaporutu. Herd had acquired a block of land for the settlers which was called Herds Point and is now the township of Rawene.

Herd and all the settlers returned to Sydney in the Rosanna on 11 February 1827 with the Lambton, The Rosanna sailed for London on 15 June 1827. Four men from the Rosanna returned to New Zealand: Thomas McLean, Benjamin Nesbit, George Nimmo and Colin Gillies. They joined Alexander Gray who abandoned the Rosanna and had remained at the Bay of Islands.

== Saint Pauli ==
The Saint Pauli was a 388-ton barque built in 1841 by Johannes Marbs. One source says it was a converted warship.

She sailed from Hamburg on 26 December 1842 to Nelson with 140 German migrants including John Beit, the New Zealand Company agent in Hamburg. Originally the ship was meant to have gone to the Chatham Islands but the British Government squashed a proposal in September 1841 to sell them to the German Colonisation Company—yet to be formed—for £10,000. The Government declared that the islands were to be part of the colony of New Zealand and that any Germans settling there would be treated as aliens. She arrived at Nelson on 14 June 1843 having had a smallpox outbreak that forced her to spend three weeks in Bahia.

On 26 April 1847 the Saint Pauli took German settlers from Hamburg to the United States, arriving at Galveston, Texas on 4 July.

== Sir Charles Forbes ==
Sir Charles Forbes was a 364-ton barque built at Aberdeen in 1824 that sailed under Captain Thomas Bacon from Gravesend on 1 May 1842 and arrived at Nelson on 22 August with 187 settlers.

== Slains Castle ==
The Slains Castle was a 504-ton barque built at London in 1836 and owned by Wigram of London. She sailed under Captain James Petrie with 242 settlers to Wellington and New Plymouth in 1840. In 1844 under Captain Dawson it brought more settlers to New Plymouth and also Nelson.

She was in Australia on three occasions between 1846 and 1851. The first two under Dawson and the third under Captain H J Andrew.

On 22 July 1852 she sailed from Gravesend under Andrew to Port Otago, arriving on 9 November,. During the voyage she sighted icebergs near 53 degrees South. On board was Tāmihana Te Rauparaha, who had been presented to the Queen Victoria.

== Thomas Harrison ==
The Thomas Harrison was a 355-ton sailing ship under Captain E.M. Smith that sailed from London on 25 May 1842 and arrived in Nelson on 25 October with 355 settlers.

== Thomas Sparks ==
The Thomas Sparks was a 497-ton sailing ship under Captain Robert G Sharp that sailed from Gravesend on 27 July 1842. She hit a rock at Table Bay, Cape Town on 3 October 1842 and remained there for 2 months for repairs. Leaving there in December, she arrived in Wellington in January 1843 and Nelson on 29 February 1843.

== Timandra ==
Timandra was a barque built at Littlehampton in 1841 and owned by J Nixon of London. She sailed under Captain Skinner and arrived in New Plymouth, New Zealand on 23 February 1842 with 212 settlers. From there she sailed to Sydney.

== Tory ==
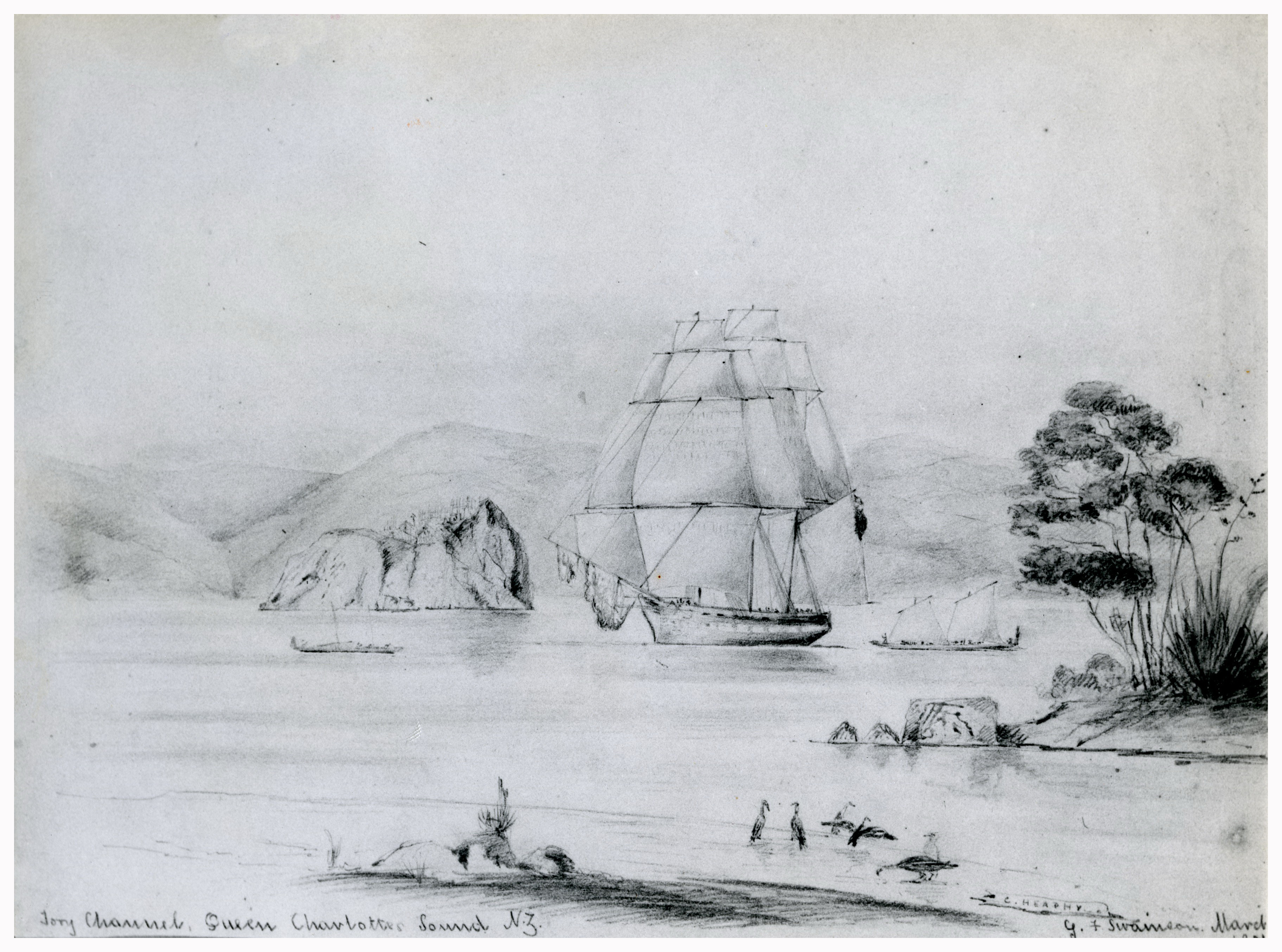
The Tory in Tory Channel, with a Māori canoe with two sails behind it, with the hills of Queen Charlotte Sound in the background

The Tory was a 382-ton barque built at Yarmouth in 1834 and acquired by the New Zealand Company for £5250 from Joseph Somes, a wealthy shipowner and member of the committee. The New Zealand Company fitted out for sailing to Wellington under Captain Edward Chaffers and conducting land acquisitions and surveys. Colonel William Wakefield was the expedition's commander. By 12 May 1839, when the Tory left England, the company had already begun advertising and selling land in New Zealand, and by the end of July—months before the company had even learned the Tory had arrived in New Zealand—all available sections for its first settlement had been sold. The Tory was the first of three New Zealand Company surveyor ships sent off in haste to prepare for settlers in New Zealand. She arrived in Queen Charlotte Sound on 17 September 1839 and Port Nicholson on 20 September.

The Tory struck a sandbank at the entrance to Kaipara Harbour. She was repaired and left Port Nicholson for Sydney on 19 April 1840 where she was refitted. In an effort to gain cargo she first sailed to Surabaya and then Batavia. Eventually at Singapore she obtained cargo for Macao. The Tory was wrecked in the Palawan Passage in the Philippine Islands on 23 January 1841.

== Tyne ==
Tyne was built in Sunderland and launched in 1841. She made three voyages to New Zealand, carrying immigrants on behalf of the New Zealand Company. She was wrecked in July 1845.

== Whitby ==
The Whitby was a 437-ton sailing ship built at Whitby in 1837. She sailed to New Zealand under Captain Lacey. It was one of the New Zealand Company ships in the expedition to survey land at Golden Bay for settlement. The Whitby sailed from Gravesend on 27 April 1841. The Literary and Scientific Institution of Nelson was created on board the ship in 1841. Captain Arthur Wakefield was the institute's Chair. At the time the location of Nelson was undecided.

== Will Watch ==
The Will Watch, of then 189 tons (bm), was built at Bombay in 1813 as Eliza. She was sold in September 1831 and renamed Will Watch. Then in 1837 she was rebuilt at Calcutta. In 1841, Will Watch, of 251 tons (bm), was owned by G Lyall of London. She sailed under Captain Walker from Gravesend on 27 April 1841 and arrived at Tasman Bay in October 1841 with the Whitby and Arrow. The ships brought members of the company's survey party for its second settlement at Nelson along with settlers.

In 1832 to 1834 she had been under Captain Barrington and sailing between Penang, Malacca, Singapore, and Calcutta. She had been involved in the opium trade under Captain Bristow. On 21 April 1840 she was in Sydney having sailed there from Calcutta under Captain Brittian.

The ship had first sailed to Port Nicholson, Wellington from England under Captain Walker arriving on 8 September 1841. After exploring Tasman Bay she returned to Wellington and by 22 June 1842 was at Singapore and bound for London still under Captain Walker.

In 1847 she sailed from Melbourne arriving at Portland Bay under Captain Irving on 12 June. She sailed from Launceston under Captain Irving and arrived at Adelaide on 10 August, and from Portland Bay under Captain Jackson arriving at Adelaide on 19 October. On 21 January 1848 she was at Port Jackson under Captain Peter Hamilton, having arrived there with 400 barrels of sperm whale oil. On 6 April she sailed from Hobart to London. She bought 104 migrants to Fremantle on 24 February 1852 and then sailed to London.

A cutter and a schooner of the same name were operating in Australian and Pacific waters in the same period. There was a 331-ton barque built a Bombay in 1813 owned by Woldridge and sailed by Captain Faremoth.

== William Bryan ==
The William Bryan was a 312-ton ship built at Buckler's Hard near Southampton on the banks of the Beaulieu River in 1816 and owned by N Domett and Co of London. She was converted to a barque in the 1830s.

On 15 February 1817 she sailed from London to Jamaica under Captain Urquhart, returning to the Thames on 30 October 1817. She may have been employed by Domett's in the sugar trade from the West Indies. She another four voyages under Urguhart. Then she sailed once under Captain Davies to Jamaica. In 1822 Urguhart returned as her Captain until 1825 when he sailed to Jamaica, but Captain England made the return journey arriving back on 17 September. Urguhart had died on 5 July and was buried at Portland, Jamaica.

On 5 January 1826 she sailed under Captain Davis. He was followed by Captain Johnson on 23 November 1827, and Captain Roman from 1829. All her voyages up to 1832 were from London to Jamaica.

In 1833 she was chartered to carry convicts to Australia. On 16 June she sailed from the Thames under Captain Roman, arriving at Hobart, Tasmania on 23 October with 130 female convicts on board. On 9 March 1834 she sailed from Hobart via Bahia, Brazil for the Thames, arriving on 27 July. She made two more voyages to Australia in 1836 and 1837, returning to the Thames on 10 September 1837.

Chartered by the New Zealand Company, the first of the New Plymouth's settlers arrived on the William Bryan under Captain Alexander McLean, which anchored off the coast on 31 March 1841 having sailed from Plymouth on 18 November 1840. In steerage were 21 married couples, 22 single adults and 70 children. George Cutfield was the head of the expedition.

She changed ownership to Frampton and Co in 1845 and made journeys to Nova Scotia under Captain J Heiter, to Peru, and to the Black Sea. By 1855 she was sheathed in yellow metal.
