= 1929 in New Zealand =

- Decades: 1900s; 1910s; 1920s; 1930s; 1940s
- See also: History of New Zealand; List of years in New Zealand; Timeline of New Zealand history

The following lists events that happened during 1929 in New Zealand.

== Population ==
- Estimated population as of 31 December: 1,486,100.
- Increase since previous 31 December 1928: 18,700 (1.27%).
- Males per 100 females: 104.1.

== Incumbents ==
=== Regal and viceregal ===
- Head of state – George V
- Governor-General – General Sir Charles Fergusson Bt GCMG KCB DSO MVO

=== Government ===
The 23rd New Zealand Parliament continued.

- Speaker of the House – Charles Statham (Independent)
- Prime Minister – TBD
- Deputy Prime Minister – TBD
- Minister of Finance – Joseph Ward (United)
- Minister of Foreign Affairs – TBD
- Chief Justice – Sir Charles Skerrett then Sir Michael Myers

=== Parliamentary opposition ===
- Leader of the Opposition – Gordon Coates (Reform)

=== Main centre leaders ===
- Mayor of Auckland – George Baildon
- Mayor of Wellington – George Troup
- Mayor of Christchurch – John Archer
- Mayor of Dunedin – William Taverner, succeeded by Robert Black

== Events ==
- 9 March: 1929 Arthur's Pass earthquake: A quake of Richter Magnitude 7.1 in the Arthur's Pass area causes extensive landslips and damage to roads and railways. There are no injuries.
- 17 June: 1929 Murchison earthquake: An earthquake of surface wave magnitude 7.8 causes the deaths of 17 people and causes great damage in Murchison and surrounding areas.
- 29 October: Black Tuesday. Wall Street crash triggers the 10-year Great Depression.
- 11 November: Edmonds Band Rotunda is formally opened in Christchurch.

== Arts and literature ==
See 1929 in art, 1929 in literature, Category:1929 books

=== Music ===
See: 1929 in music

=== Radio ===
See: Public broadcasting in New Zealand

=== Film ===
See: Category:1929 film awards, 1929 in film, List of New Zealand feature films, Cinema of New Zealand, Category:1929 films

== Sport ==
=== Badminton ===
- National Champions
  - Men's singles: J. Southon
  - Women's singles: A. Ellett
  - Men's doubles: T. Kelly and J. McLean
  - Women's doubles: E. Hetley and F. Harvey
  - Mixed doubles: T. Kelly and A. Ellett

=== Chess ===
The 38th National Chess Championship was held in Wellington, and was won by J.A. Erskine of Melbourne.

=== Golf ===
- The 19th New Zealand Open championship was won by Andrew Shaw.
- The 33rd National Amateur Championships were held in Wanganui
  - Men: Sloan Morpeth (Maungakiekie) – 3rd title
  - Women: Mrs P.L. Dodgshun (Dunedin).

=== Horse racing ===
==== Harness racing ====
- New Zealand Trotting Cup – Peter Bingen (2nd win)
- Auckland Trotting Cup – Gold Jacket (2nd win)

==== Thoroughbred racing ====
- New Zealand Cup – Chide
- Avondale Gold Cup – Historic
- Auckland Cup – Concentrate
- Wellington Cup – Vertigern
- New Zealand Derby – Honour

=== Lawn bowls ===
The national outdoor lawn bowls championships are held in Wellington.

- Men's singles champion – A.R. Coltman (Carlton Bowling Club)
- Men's pair champions – A.G. Kinvig, F. Laurenson (skip) (Linwood Bowling Club)
- Men's fours champions – C.E. Hardley, F. Needham, I. Clarke, Bill Bremner (skip) (West End Bowling Club, Auckland)

=== Rugby ===
Category:Rugby union in New Zealand, Category:All Blacks

- Ranfurly Shield

=== Rugby league ===
New Zealand national rugby league team

=== Shooting ===
- Ballinger Belt – William Masefield (Sounds)

=== Soccer ===
- 1929 Chatham Cup won by Tramways (Auckland)
- Provincial league champions:
  - Auckland: Tramways
  - Canterbury: Thistle
  - Hawke's Bay: Napier YMCA
  - Nelson: Thistle
  - Otago: Seacliff
  - South Canterbury: Albion Rovers
  - Southland: Corinthians
  - Taranaki: Stratford
  - Waikato: Claudelands Rovers
  - Wanganui: Thistle
  - Wellington: Diamond

== Births ==
=== January ===
- 7 January – Peter Bartlett, architect and academic (died 2019)
- 10 January – Grahame Jarratt, rower (died 2011)
- 13 January – James Beal, boxer (died 1996)
- 19 January – Brian Steele, rugby union player
- 24 January – Stuart Jones, cricketer (died 2015)

=== February ===
- 6 February
  - Maurice Dixon, rugby union player (died 2004)
  - Noel Hilliard, author and novelist (died 1996)
  - Colin Murdoch, pharmacist, veterinarian, inventor (died 2008)
- 12 February – Kevin Dwyer, cricketer (died 2020)
- 14 February
  - Noel Dellow, cricketer (died 2021)
  - Jenny King, librarian (died 2021)
- 16 February – Venn Young, politician (died 1993)

=== March ===
- 6 March
  - Ian Irvine, rugby union player, disability rights advocate (died 2013)
  - Ronald Trubuhovich, medical practitioner, critical care specialist (died 2026)
- 7 March
  - Ian McKay, jurist (died 2014)
  - Tom Weal, politician (died 2016)
- 9 March – Les Rackley, boxing trainer (died 2021)
- 12 March – William Liley, perinatal physiologist (died 1983)
- 21 March
  - Lesley Rowe, athlete (died 2011)
  - Iritana Tāwhiwhirangi, Māori language advocate
- 22 March – Dennis Copps, cricket umpire (died 2020)
- 24 March
  - Hugh Templeton, diplomat, politician
  - Ian Templeton, journalist, writer
- 25 March – Allan Wright, farmer and businessman (died 2022)
- 26 March – Joye Evans, guiding leader (died 2021)
- 27 March
  - Shona McFarlane, artist, writer, broadcaster (died 2001)
  - Hallard White, rugby union player, coach and administrator (died 2016)

=== April ===
- 1 April – Te Huirangi Waikerepuru, Māori language advocate, trade unionist (died 2020)
- 2 April – Robert Ellis, artist (died 2021)
- 6 April – Pat Goodman, businessman, philanthropist (died 2017)
- 9 April
  - Aubrey Begg, politician (died 1988)
  - Fred Hollows, eye surgeon (died 1993)
  - Denford McDonald, businessman (died 2020)
- 12 April – Ponty Reid, rugby union player (died 1994)
- 21 April
  - Bevin Hough, rugby league player, field athlete (died 2019)
  - Ross Smith, rugby union player (died 2002)
- 25 April – Yvette Williams, athlete (died 2019)
- 30 April – Keith Smith, cricketer (died 2016)

=== May ===
- 2 May – Graham Gedye, cricketer (died 2014)
- 10 May – Miles Warren, architect (died 2022)
- 15 May – Angela Annabell, musicologist (died 2000)
- 19 May – Mavis Rivers, jazz singer (died 1992)
- 26 May – Fraser Bergersen, plant biologist (died 2011)
- 31 May – Thelma Turner, netball player (died 2023)

=== June ===
- 3 June – Les Lock, racing cyclist (died 2003)
- 6 June – June Sutor, crystallographer (died 1990)
- 7 June – Colin Graham, cricketer (died 2020)
- 30 June
  - Ed Dolejs, softball coach (died 2019)
  - David Perry, cricketer (died 2007)

=== July ===
- 2 July – Hugh Morris, businessman (died 2010)
- 8 July – Vern Bakalich, rugby league player (died 2015)
- 18 July – Colin Moyle, politician (died 2024)
- 19 July – Renée, writer (died 2023)
- 23 July – Johnny Cooper, rock and roll musician (died 2014)
- 26 July – David Tompkins, judge (died 2023)

=== August ===
- 1 August – Phyllis Guthardt, Methodist minister, university chancellor (died 2023)
- 5 August
  - Harry Atkinson, physicist and science administrator (died 2018)
  - Arthur Woods, rugby union player (died 2015)
- 10 August
  - Eric Dunn, cricketer
  - Brian Pickworth, fencer (died 2020)
  - Ross Wightman, rugby union player (died 2012)
- 19 August – David Levene, businessman, philanthropist (died 2021)
- 23 August – Bob Bell, politician (died 2011)
- 24 August – Oliver Jessel, businessman (died 2017)
- 25 August – John Hippolite, political activist (died 1993)
- 29 August – Helen Hughes, scientist

=== September ===
- 1 September – Indianapolis, Standardbred racehorse
- 3 September – Steve Rickard, professional wrestler, trainer and promoter (died 2015)
- 4 September – Howard Charles Clark, chemist, university administrator
- 5 September – Margaret Loutit, microbiologist (died 2020)
- 9 September
  - Graham Avery, racing cyclist (died 2015)
  - Pat Booth, journalist (died 2018)
- 19 September – Phil Bygrave, field hockey player (died 2012)
- 26 September – Tim Raphael, Anglican clergyman (died 2016)
- 28 September – Bill Hunt, alpine skier (died 2009)
- 30 September – Yvonne du Fresne, writer (died 2011)

=== October ===
- 8 October – Ron Crocombe, Pacific studies academic (died 2009)
- 9 October – Peter Button, helicopter pilot (died 1987)
- 11 October
  - Annette Baier, philosopher (died 2012)
  - Augusta Wallace, jurist (died 2008)
- 20 October
  - Mary Earle, food technologist (died 2021)
  - William Gough, cricketer (died 1978)
- 28 October – Tom Puna, cricketer (died 1996)

=== November ===
- 8 November – Trevor McMahon, cricketer
- 13 November – Brian Sorenson, cricketer (died 2009)
- 16 November – Bill Clark, rugby union player (died 2010)
- 18 November – Bill Alington, architect (died 2024)
- 19 November – Basil Meeking, Roman Catholic bishop (died 2020)
- 20 November – Pat Kelly, trade unionist (died 2004)
- 23 November – Felix Donnelly, Roman Catholic priest, social activist, writer, broadcaster (died 2019)
- 26 November – Brian Coote, legal academic (died 2019)
- 28 November – Ray Hitchcock, cricketer, racehorse breeder (died 2019)

=== December ===
- 7 December – John Hotop, rugby union player (died 2015)
- 14 December – Ron Jarden, rugby union player, sharebroker (died 1977)
- 15 December – Noel Scott, politician (died 2018)
- 19 December – Michael Fowler, architect, politician (died 2022)
- 26 December – Margaret Lawlor-Bartlett, artist
- 27 December – Elizabeth Edgar, botanist (died 2019)
- 28 December – Alison Quentin-Baxter, lawyer (died 2023)

=== Undated ===
- Cuddle, Thoroughbred racehorse
- Jacqueline Fahey, painter, writer
- Brian McMahon, venereologist, army officer
- Alistair Paterson, writer, poet

== Deaths ==
=== January–March ===
- 21 January – Alexander William Bickerton, chemistry academic (born 1842)
- 7 February – Sir Douglas Maclean, farmer, politician (born 1852)
- 13 February – Sir Charles Skerrett, jurist (born 1863)
- 28 February – George Allen, architect, surveyor, tourist guide (born 1837)
- 7 March – Henare Uru, politician (born 1872)
- 11 March – Harry Diddams, politician (born 1864)
- 23 March – Niniwa Heremaia, editor, Ngāti Kahungunu leader (born 1854)
- 26 March – Waitaoro, Ngāti Tama leader (born c.1848)

=== April–June ===
- 7 April – Alfred Whitehouse, motion picture exhibitor and producer (born 1856)
- 19 April – Alfred Fitchett, Anglican clergyman (born 1836)
- 3 May
  - Charles Mackay, lawyer, politician, mayor of Wanganui (1906–1920) (born 1875)
  - Sir James Wilson, politician (born 1849)
- 5 May – Maria Williams, schoolteacher (born 1839)
- 11 May – Herbert Kissling, cricketer and insurance executive (born 1868)
- 19 June – Margaret Gardner, farmer, flour mill owner (born 1844)
- 20 June – Ann (Jenny) Wimperis, watercolour artist (born 1844)
- 24 June – Tupu Atanatiu Taingakawa Te Waharoa, Ngāti Hauā and Kīngitanga leader (born c.1844)
- 27 June – Maata Te Taiawatea Rangitūkehu, Ngāti Awa and Tuhourangi leader (born c.1848)

=== July–September ===
- 10 July – James Arnold, trade unionist, politician (born 1859)
- 12 July – Alex Lithgow, composer and bandleader (born 1870)
- 24 July – Albert Bates, architect (born 1862)
- 15 August – Carl Dahl, businessman, importer, community leader (born 1856)
- 20 August – Arnold Williams, cricketer (born 1870)
- 29 August – Arthur Riley, artist, educationalist, businessman (born 1860)
- 30 August – Sarah Cryer, farmer, community leader (born 1848)
- 31 August – Henry Baigent, timber miller, politician (born 1844)
- 1 September – Mary Gibson, schoolteacher (born 1864)
- 5 September – Mariano Vella, seaman, fisherman, farmer (born 1855)
- 8 September – Robert Wynn Williams, politician (born 1864)
- 18 September – John Bollons, mariner, naturalist, ethnographer (born 1862)
- 23 September – Sir George Fenwick, newspaper editor and proprietor (born 1847)
- 27 September – Nisbet McRobie, rugby union player, newspaper proprietor, politician (born 1872)

=== October–December ===
- 25 October – Charles Chilton, zoologist (born 1860)
- 13 November – Richard Henry, conservationist (born 1845)
- 29 November – Albert Turnbull, cricketer (born 1866)
- 7 December – Sir John Findlay, politician (born 1862)
- 9 December – Henry Cleary, Roman Catholic bishop (born 1859)
- 19 December – William Maslin, politician (born 1850)
- 28 December – Mads Christensen, Lutheran pastor (born 1856)
- 30 December – Charles Tuke, cricketer (born 1858)

== See also ==
- History of New Zealand
- List of years in New Zealand
- Military history of New Zealand
- Timeline of New Zealand history
- Timeline of New Zealand's links with Antarctica
- Timeline of the New Zealand environment
