= New Zealand Land Commission =

The New Zealand Land Commission was a 19th-century government inquiry into the validity of claims to land purchases by European settlers from the New Zealand Māori people made prior to 1840, when New Zealand was part of the Australian colony of New South Wales. The inquiry was designed to determine who owned what land, in order to formalise and regulate land ownership in the new colony. The commission carried out its work in two distinct sections—a three-man inquiry to examine purchases in general throughout New Zealand, and a one-man inquiry run by English lawyer William Spain to investigate just those purchases claimed by the New Zealand Company. The commissions were to advise the Governor of which claims were accepted, with the expectation that landowners would then be awarded a Crown grant to their property.

The first inquiry ran from January 1841 to September 1844, and investigated more than 1000 claims throughout the country, with the majority of them in the Bay of Islands, Auckland and Kaipara regions. It allowed just under half of those claims, although concerns remained that in many cases there were doubts that Māori who had sold land had the right to do so.

Spain conducted his hearings between May 1842 and August 1844 in the areas in which the New Zealand Company had bought land—Wellington and Porirua, Manawatu, Wanganui, Taranaki and Nelson. Spain initially encountered, but overcame, attempts by the New Zealand Company's principal agent, William Wakefield, to obstruct his work and finally concluded that the company had made valid purchases in only two of the areas it claimed—Manawatu and New Plymouth. Under instructions from London, Spain sought to identify lands that were in the "actual occupation and enjoyment" of Māori, believing that uncultivated lands were not truly owned by Māori. Subsequently, where it was found sales had not been conducted properly Spain opted to transfer the land to Crown ownership rather than return it to the original Māori owners. In September 1842, after just three months of hearings, Spain ceased his exhaustive investigation into the background and validity of sales and switched his efforts to arbitrating amounts of compensation that would be paid to Māori for the loss of their land. Māori had no input in the negotiations.

Spain's decision on the New Plymouth claims came close to sparking Māori violence against settlers and was overturned by Governor Robert FitzRoy, creating a long-running feud between the pair that lasted until Spain's departure from New Zealand.

It took more than two decades to resolve the question of European land titles to pre-annexation purchases. A variety of methods were used, including new legislation, another land commission, land exchanges with Māori, land purchases and military action to oust Māori from some areas.

== First land commission ==
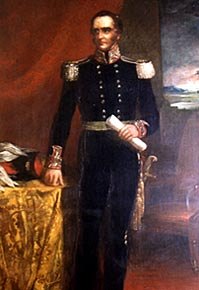
Governor George Gipps

The Treaty of Waitangi, which in its English language version transferred sovereignty over New Zealand to the British Crown, was first signed at Waitangi on 6 February 1840.

Three months later New South Wales Governor George Gipps introduced to the New South Wales Legislative Council the New Zealand Land Claims Bill to establish a New Zealand Land Commission, which would investigate the validity of all purchases of land in New Zealand from Māori. The legislation was passed on 4 August 1840 and in late September Gipps appointed three commissioners—a lawyer, Francis Fisher, and two New South Wales military officers, retired colonel Edward Godfrey and Captain Mathew Richmond, who was a former British Resident of the Ionian Islands. Neither Godfrey nor Richmond, who carried out the bulk of the commission's work, had any legal training. They were instructed not to investigate any derivative claim—sales in which land had not been bought directly from Māori—nor any sales by non-British nationals. In September 1840 the Governor also exempted all New Zealand Company purchases from the inquiry, after receiving a deputation from settlers in Wellington who were worried they would lose their homes if the New Zealand Company's purchases were found to be deficient.

Their public hearings inquiry began in January 1841 at Russell in the Bay of Islands, with the commissioners assisted by an interpreter, a surveyor and the Protector of Aborigines, who acted as an advocate and counsel for Māori witnesses. In June, with New Zealand by then a separate colony, their powers were transferred to a New Zealand statute. They continued through to September 1844, holding a total of 1049 inquiries into land sales, most of them in the Bay of Islands, Auckland and Kaipara regions, as well as Waikato and North Taranaki. In 1843 hearings were also conducted in the South Island and Stewart Island, examining purchases in Banks Peninsula and Otago.

The commissioners found that the claimants fell into four basic categories—speculators, church missionaries, settlers and derivative purchasers—with most sales made after 1836 and reaching a peak in 1839. The size of land purchases made by individuals ranged from small pieces of less than an acre to several tracts of over 1 million acres each, with Church Missionary Society purchases among the biggest. Payment had been made with cash and a wide variety of goods including clothes, blankets, tools and guns.

By early 1842 it was apparent to the commissioners that Māori who had accepted payment in money or goods had had no intention of total alienation of all the land within the vast general boundaries outlined in some of the deeds. Godfrey and Richmond had no hesitation in dismissing as utterly unintelligible, to Māori or European, some of the pretentious deeds drawn up in pseudo-legalistic English. In many cases the commissioners accepted the evidence of Māori over that of the claimants. They found boundaries to be inadequately described in most deeds, the acreages grossly exaggerated, the claims overlapped, with Māori usually having little idea of area or boundaries in English terms.

The commissioners allowed 490 claims; most of those disallowed were greater than 1000 acres, with 241 disallowed because the claimants failed to appear at the hearings. The commissioners commonly reduced land boundaries or recommended the addition of Māori reserves. Chief Protector George Clarke noted that of the 490 claims the commissioners allowed: "All that has been ascertained is that various Europeans have made purchases from certain natives, but whether those natives had a right to sell or how that right was acquired, is still, in the majority of cases, quite a matter of doubt."

Fisher resigned from the commission on 25 June 1841 after being provisionally appointed as Attorney-General; in July 1843 Richmond also left when he was appointed Chief Police Magistrate of the Southern District.

== William Spain's land commission ==
Spain had worked as an attorney in London before his appointment as New Zealand Land Commissioner and was an active supporter of the Liberal Party. George Clarke Jnr, a clerk in the Native Department who served as a translator during the land claim commission hearings, described him as "a man of solid intelligence, but with a good deal of legal pedantry about him. He was somewhat slow in thinking, very wooden in his apprehension of ways of dealing with new emergencies, steady and rather plodding in his ways, thoroughly honest in intention, and utterly immovable in threats, though he may have been softened by flattery."

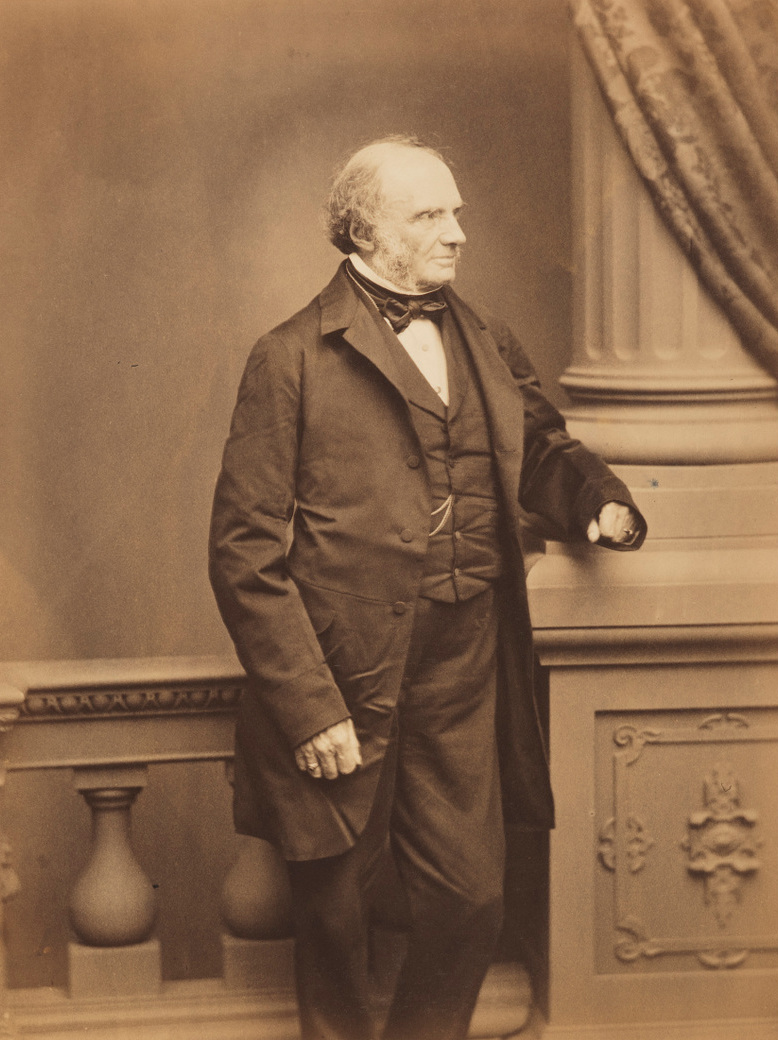
Colonial Secretary Lord John Russell

His appointment followed the signing of an agreement in November 1840 between the Colonial Office and the New Zealand Company that awarded the company a royal charter of incorporation. The company would be given a Crown grant to land in defined areas of the country, including Wellington and New Plymouth, but abandon claim to the 20 million acres it claimed to have bought during the 1839 expedition of the company vessel, Tory. On 3 December the British Government told the company that a commission would be set up to investigate all the company's New Zealand land titles, after which bona fide purchases would be confirmed with a Crown grant.

British Colonial Secretary Lord John Russell selected Spain to fill the role of commissioner, to take effect from 20 January 1841, believing that having a British rather than a local government appointee would be seen as more impartial. Spain was given a fixed annual salary of £2000, which equalled that of the Chief Justice and made the pair the second-highest paid public officials in New Zealand, behind the Governor. Among his instructions, Russell directed that the commissioner and Governor define on the map land that was in the "actual occupation and enjoyment" of Māori; certain areas were to be made inalienable for Māori use and occupation, with the balance, described as "waste land", to become Crown land. Historian Alan Ward noted: "Russell’s view that uncultivated lands were not truly owned by Māori, strongly influenced official attitudes at this time."

Spain left London in mid-April, but suffered shipwreck on the voyage and did not arrive in New Zealand until 8 December 1841. Some confusion surrounded his role: Russell had intended that Spain be the sole land commissioner, but Spain—possibly on discovering two other commissioners were already at work—told Hobson he would supervise their work. Hobson rejected the proposal, insisting the task was so vast it would require them all to be engaged in inquiries around the country. He directed Spain to proceed immediately to Wellington to investigate the New Zealand Company purchases that were defined in an agreement Hobson had made with the company in September 1841. In that agreement the Crown indicated its acceptance of certain earlier land purchases—110,000 acres at Port Nicholson, Porirua and Manawatu, 50,000 acres at Wanganui and 50,000 acres (later lifted to 60,000 acres) at New Plymouth—with the guarantee conditional on the company proving it had fairly extinguished the Māori title. Spain's task, then, was to first establish who had actually held the title to the lands before they were sold to the company, a difficult task in itself, and then find whether the sales were legitimate. Under instructions from Colonial Secretary Lord Stanley to Governor Robert FitzRoy, any land deemed to be in excess of a valid claim should be retained by the Crown. Stanley, who succeeded Russell in August 1841, explained: "The excess is vested in the sovereign as representing and protecting the interest of society at large ... for the purposes of sale and settlement."

Hobson appointed George Clarke, then aged 19, as the commission's interpreter and Sub-Protector of Aborigines (his father George Clarke Senior had been appointed Chief Protector in May 1841); his duty was to look after Māori interests during the investigations. At the outset his interrogation of witnesses was exhaustive, with lengthy evidence taken and recorded in both Māori and English.

=== Port Nicholson ===
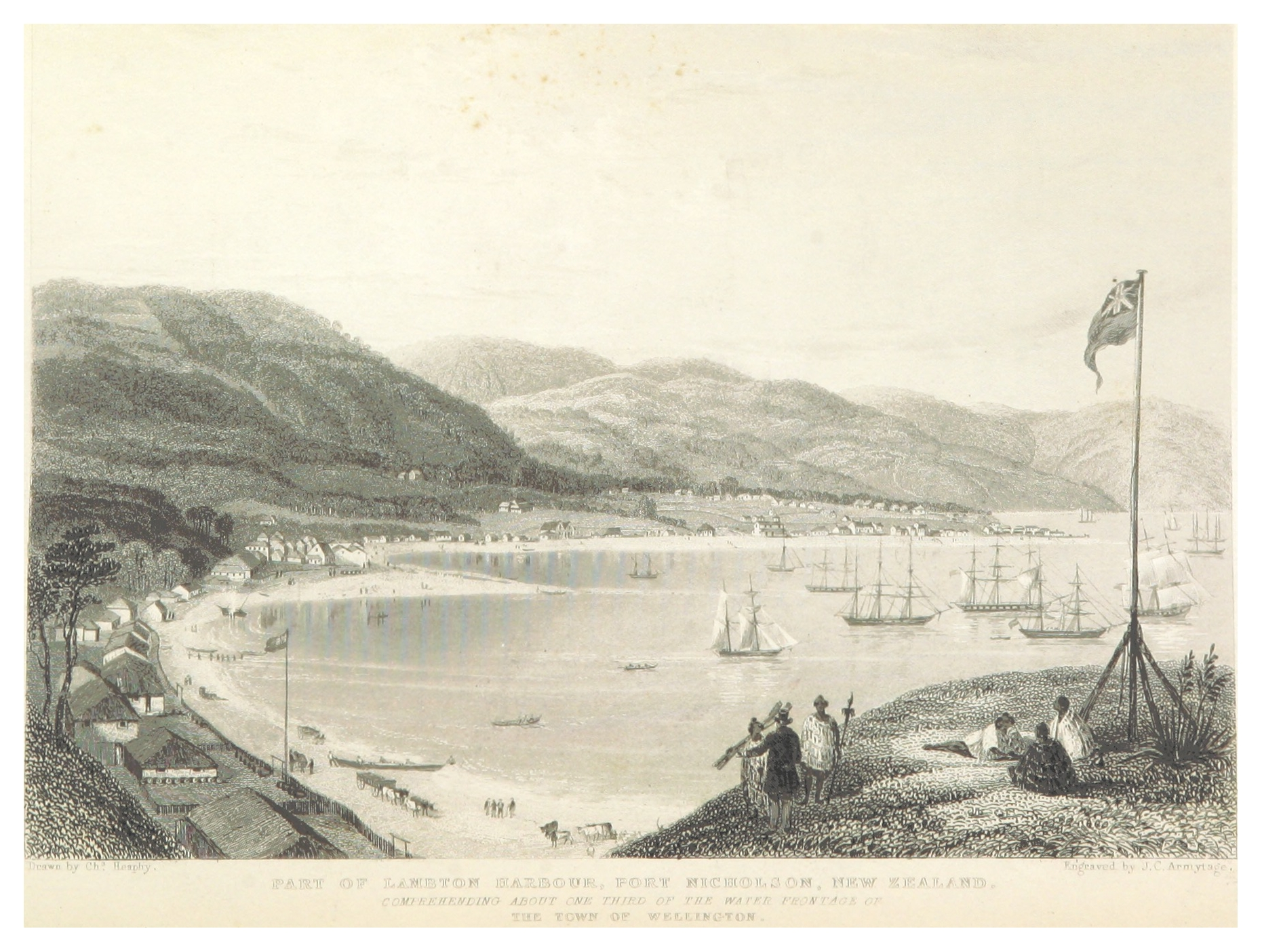
Lambton Harbour at Port Nicholson.

Spain began his Wellington hearings on 16 May 1842 and began with the Port Nicholson sale. William Wakefield, Jerningham Wakefield and two other company men gave evidence, as well as Te Puni, chief at Petone pā, who had taken a leading part in the sale. After three days William Wakefield, who presumed the hearings would be a mere formality, said he rested his case. Spain considered the case far from proven and asked Wakefield to produce more witnesses. The company produced Wi Tako Ngātata, the chief of Kumototo Pā, whose evidence contradicted that of earlier witnesses. Realising the investigation would be a thorough one, Wakefield began a public campaign of obstruction and criticism, refusing to appear and causing delays for the hearings. A local newspaper, the New Zealand Gazette and Wellington Spectator, took up Wakefield's cause and for months criticised and ridiculed Spain, Clarke and Hobson.

By late August Wakefield realised Spain's findings were likely to be unfavourable to the company and wrote to the commissioner and offered to make cash payments to Māori who had missed out on payments in 1839. Spain had already come to the conclusion that Māori at Te Aro, Kumutoto, Pipitea and Kaiwharawhara pā had had no intention of selling their pā, cultivations and burial grounds and would not now move, and that reserves allotted them by the company, mainly on hilly ground, were unsuitable. Spain considered the offer of a further cash payment to be reasonable, explaining that "the natives who denied the sale seemed to be more anxious to obtain payment for their land than to dispossess the settlers then in occupation of it". He thought giving land back to the Māori was impractical because Wellington's population had grown to about 3000, outnumbering Māori by at least five to one.

Spain also questioned a key witness, Dicky Barrett, who had acted as interpreter in the Port Nicholson sale, concluding he had barely understood the terms of the sale, let alone had the ability to translate it accurately; nor had he explained to Wakefield the political undercurrents of the sale. In January 1843 acting Governor Willoughby Shortland advised both Spain and Wakefield he approved of the plan to compensate Māori for land that had not been properly alienated; from that point the focus of Spain's commission switched from investigating the validity of the sales to negotiating the amount of compensation to be paid when the evidence for a proper sale was slight.

=== Wanganui, Manawatu, Hutt Valley ===
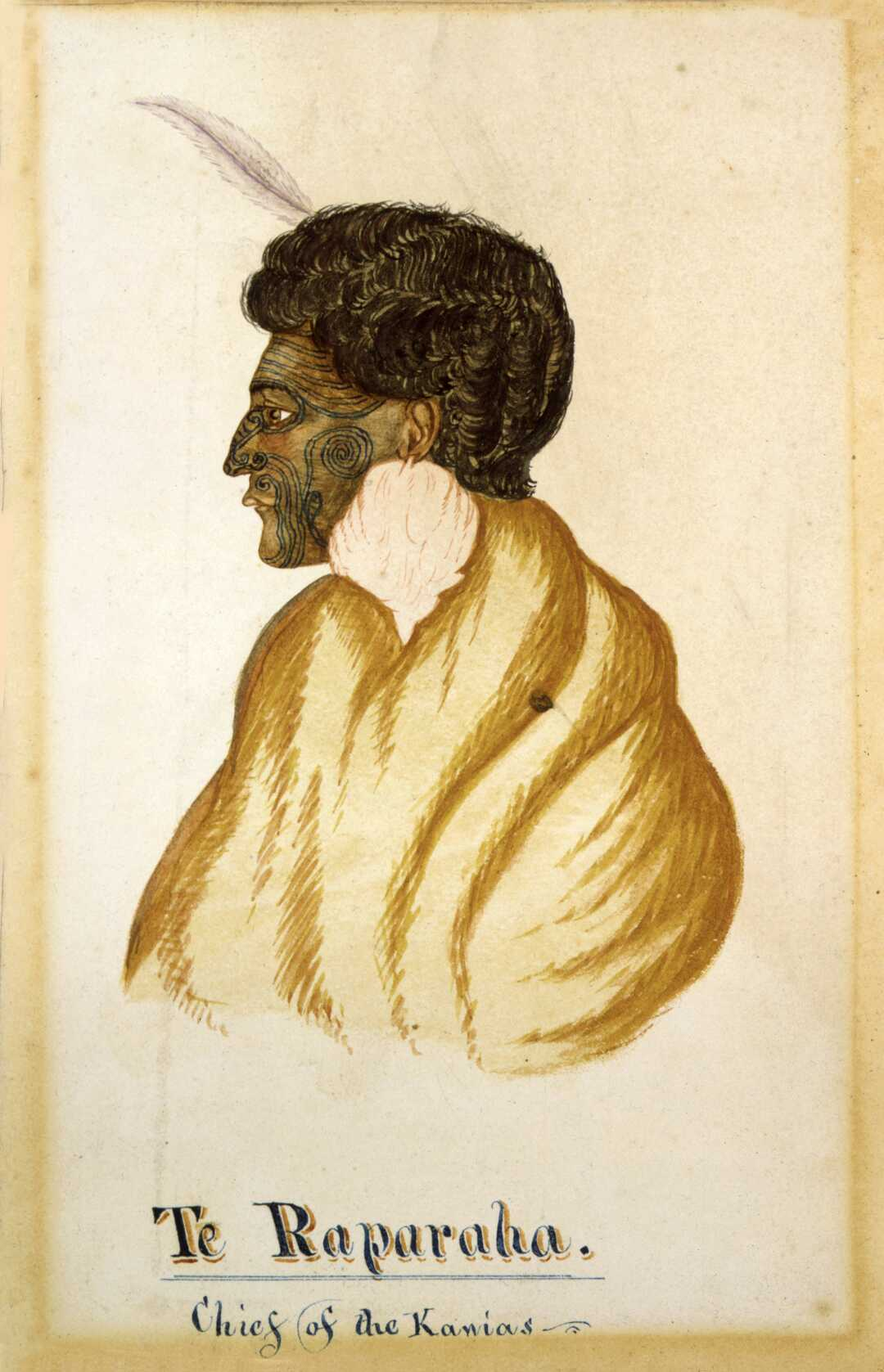
Ngāti Toa chief Te Rauparaha

Despite the agreement to negotiate and pay compensation, Wakefield baulked at the compensation amounts being sought by Clarke, so Spain closed the Port Nicholson hearings and travelled north to investigate land sales at Porirua, Waikanae, Otaki, Manawatu and Wanganui. At Wanganui, tensions were high because of the presence of more than 200 European settlers attempting to farm and build on land many Māori said had not been sold. Wakefield again obstructed Spain's inquiry, failing to appear at hearings and forcing Spain to examine witnesses himself, putting to them the questions he would have expected the company's counsel to put. After a three-week hearing Spain ruled that the company was entitled to land only on the west side of the Whanganui River, and that even that claim was deficient. Spain, however, decided the Māori owners would not be given the land back, but instead be compensated for it and he subsequently negotiated an amount, which took more than a year to be paid. Further hearings over sales at Manawatu and the Nelson area were attended by Ngāti Toa chiefs Te Rauparaha and Te Rangihaeata, but Wakefield again hindered the investigation by failing to appear. After hearing evidence Spain ruled that the New Zealand Company could not claim any title to Porirua.

In March 1843 Clarke told Wakefield the company would need to pay £1500 to the Port Nicholson Māori to adequately compensate them for land that had not been properly alienated. As Wakefield continued to stall the process, Māori frustration grew and in August they sent a deputation to Spain—who had by then opted to suspend hearings and move on to investigate the Taranaki claims—accusing him of colluding with the company to delay payments. Acting governor Shortland demanded that Wakefield state definitively if the company would pay or not, and Wakefield—possibly spurred into action by the shock of the explosion of violence in the Wairau Affray in June, sparked by a land claim there—relented and agreed to continue negotiations. The company, however, continued to state that all pā, cultivations and burial grounds should be included in any settlements. Knowing a proper resolution was impossible, Spain closed correspondence and in late August returned to Auckland, where he prepared a report for new Governor Robert FitzRoy on his work to date.

Spain reported that most of the land claimed by the New Zealand Company where he had visited had either not been alienated to the company at all or had been only partially so because of the "loose and careless manner" of the purchasing process, including identifying those with the right to sell. He said pā, cultivations and burial grounds had definitely never been sold to the company, although roads had since been cut through some of them. He found that the interpreters used by the company had also failed to explain the amount of land being negotiated or the reserve system in a way that was intelligible to the Māori. Spain recommended that the government pay all compensation that was due—possibly as much as £6000 in the North Island alone—and that the company be awarded a Crown grant only after it had repaid that amount to the government.

In January 1844 FitzRoy visited Wellington and reopened negotiations with Wakefield on compensation, making clear that no Crown grants would be issued until compensation was paid. Wakefield agreed to pay £1500 to the Port Nicholson area Māori, although their chiefs, led by those of Te Aro pā, rejected that amount—which had been calculated by Clarke alone—as inadequate. The standoff continued for several days until the sum was accepted and distributed in shillings.

In March Spain and Clarke tried unsuccessfully to negotiate a compensation deal with Te Rauparaha and Te Rangihaeata for land in the Hutt Valley. Although rebuffed, Spain and Clarke would not accept the Māoris' refusal, deciding that the Port Nicholson area had to be completely ceded and that compensation money would simply be banked for later use by Ngāti Toa. In a letter to Te Rauparaha Spain cited Emer de Vattel's work, Law of Nations, to explain that a civilised nation had the right to occupy a country or continent occupied by "erratic" people who were not making productive use of the land, as such inhabitants could not be seen as having true, legal possession. By April 1844 most of the Māori titles in the Port Nicholson district were settled and the vital town site and most of the country area were secured for European occupation.

Spain returned to Manawatu and Wanganui, but discovered chiefs now refused to sell regardless of the level of compensation, ignoring William Wakefield's attempt to distribute £1000 in gold and silver coins. Although the Land Claims Ordinance authorised Spain only to "respectfully recommend" the payment of compensation, he told chiefs: "Your refusal to accept the payment will not prevent the land going to the Europeans." He awarded the company almost all it had claimed and held the money for it to be later claimed by Māori in those areas.

=== Taranaki ===
Spain's most problematic inquiry was the one he conducted over the company's claims in Taranaki where, since 1842, Te Āti Awa Māori had been returning home in increasing numbers, after lengthy periods of captivity by Waikato and Ngāti Maniapoto iwi. Waikato raids had also forced other Taranaki Māori to migrate southwards between the mid-1820s and early 1830s to live as exiles, and almost all had been absent when their land had been "sold" to the New Zealand Company. The land had been sold over the course of three transactions—at Kāpiti on 25 October 1839, Queen Charlotte Sound on 8 November 1839 and New Plymouth on 15 February 1840. By 31 May 1844, when Spain opened his Taranaki hearings in New Plymouth, about 900 Māori had returned to settlements spread along the coastal strip between Paritutu and Waitara, heightening tensions with settlers who attempted to clear and cultivate land for which they had paid the company. Te Āti Awa were prepared to accept the alienation of lands belonging to those present at the original sale but refused to give up any other ancestral land unless it was paid for. The company baulked at giving into such demands, and some settlers were consequently harassed or driven off their properties.

From the outset Spain refused to accept the land ownership claims of non-resident Māori. He explained in his report that "the admission of the right of slaves, who had been absent for a long period of years, to return at any time and claim their right to land that had belonged to them previously to their being taken prisoners of war and which ... had been sold by the conquerors and resident natives to third parties, would establish a most dangerous doctrine, calculated to throw doubts upon almost every European title to land in this country." Spain, however, ignored the fact that it was only the presence of European settlers that provided the security for them to return. His view was strongly opposed by both his assistants, George Clarke and Thomas Forsaith, a Māori interpreter and Protector of Aborigines.

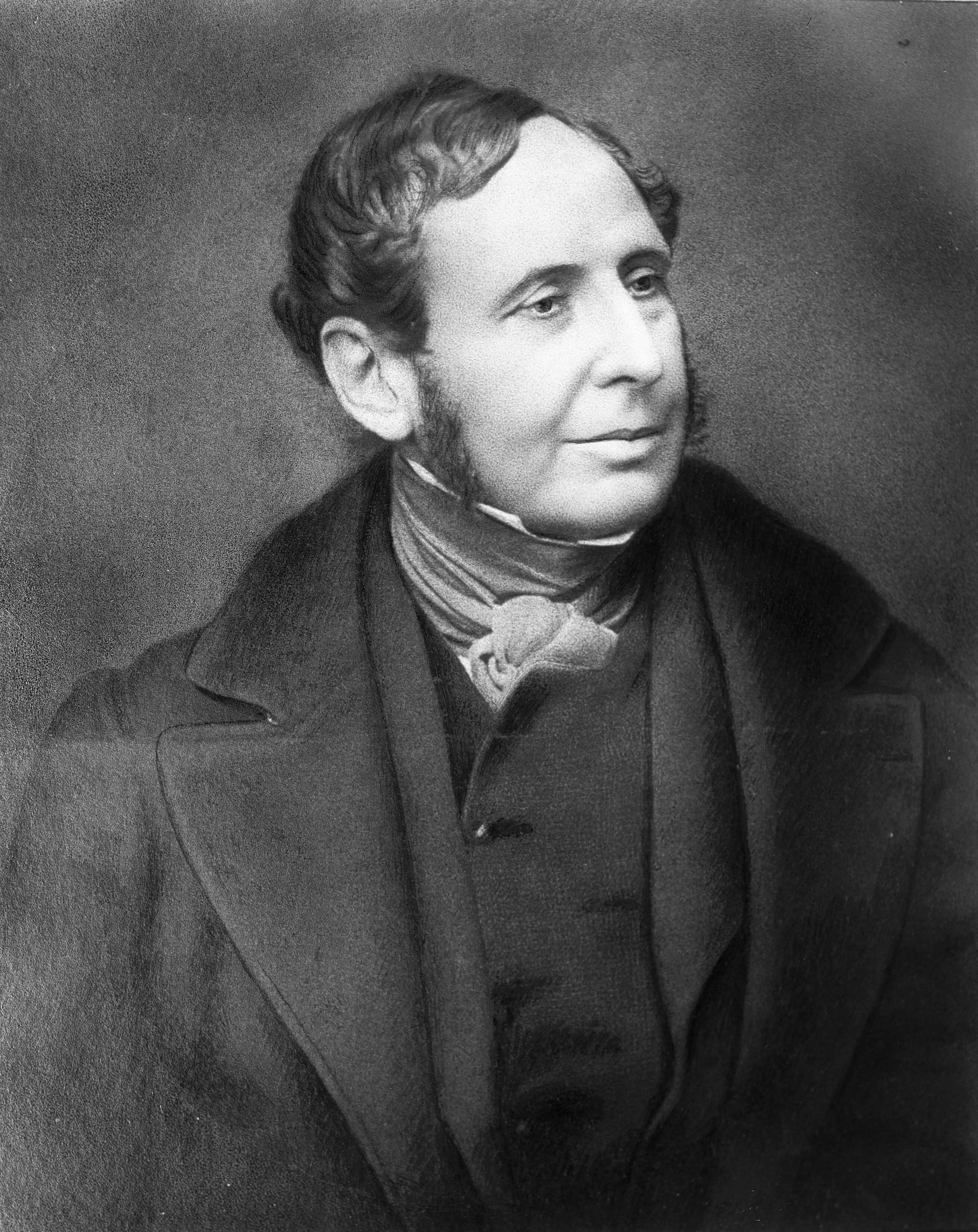
Governor Robert FitzRoy

Spain closed his court on 6 June and announced his decision two days later before a large crowd of Māori and Europeans. He ruled that the company was entitled to the 60,000 acres it claimed, with the exception of Māori pā, burial grounds and cultivations and 6000 acres of reserves, and two other sections reserved for Dicky Barrett and the Wesleyan Missionary Society. In his report Spain said the Taranaki purchase was the only one by the New Zealand Company in which the deed had been explained properly and an adequate payment made—even though he had earlier found Barrett's interpretations of the Port Nicholson purchase deeds to be vastly inadequate. European settlers welcomed Spain's decision, but the Āti Awa immediately expressed anger and were restrained from destroying outlying settlers' property only with the assurance by Clarke that FitzRoy would listen to their appeals. Increasingly nervous settlers appealed to FitzRoy for military protection, while Āti Awa chiefs, including Wiremu Kīngi Te Rangitāke, who had signed a Taranaki sale deed with a company representative at Queen Charlotte Sound in November 1839, sent a petition to FitzRoy protesting that it was wrong for the Europeans to take lands, particularly at Waitara, which Māori had never sold. In early July FitzRoy despatched Protector of Aborigines Donald McLean to Taranaki to placate the Māori and on 2 August arrived there himself to plead for peace. He told a crowd of 300 the next day that he did not agree with Spain's dismissal of the absentees' claims, and expressed his empathy for those whose land had been sold after they had been carried off by a war party as a slave.

FitzRoy returned to New Plymouth in early October 1844 and confirmed that he had overturned Spain's judgment, declaring that all the awarded land would have to be repurchased from the Māori owners; if this was not done the government would not guarantee any settler a title for, or protection of, his land. FitzRoy later wrote: "It appeared so clear ... that the view taken by the land commissioner could not be adopted by the government without causing bloodshed, and the probable ruin of the settlement; because the injustice of awarding land to the New Zealand Company, which was well known not to have been purchased by them, was apparent to every native." FitzRoy's decision infuriated Spain, whose resignation was then demanded by the Governor. On 23 November FitzRoy paid £350 to the Ngāti Te Whiti hapū for 3500 acres, which included the New Plymouth township. His decision, which meant only that small area was now officially available for settlement, this time left the settlers enraged and dismayed. It also infuriated Wakefield and Spain, who believed the commission had been robbed of its authority and stability.

=== Nelson area ===
Spain's final area of inquiry was the Nelson area, including the Wairau Valley. The hearings had been scheduled to begin in June 1843 but were delayed by the violent clash in the Wairau Valley on 17 June in which 26 lives were lost. FitzRoy, who arrived in New Zealand about two months later, conducted his own inquiry into the affray and ruled that the Europeans were at fault for pressing ahead with efforts to survey the land rather than wait for Spain's investigation and adjudication. Because of those events, Spain's inquiry at Nelson did not begin until 19 August 1844. By then Wakefield had adopted a more conciliatory approach and had decided to pay Māori compensation where Spain decided it was necessary—in Port Nicholson, Wanganui and Manawatu—and also decided to abandon claim to any land in the Wairau Valley.

After just two days of hearings Wakefield offered to pay £800 compensation to local Māori who had received no payment from Te Rauparaha and Te Rangihaeata in 1839. The money was paid and distributed at a final court session on 24 August and a deed of conveyance signed by the main chiefs of each district. Spain awarded the company title to 151,000 acres in the Tasman and Golden Bay area—11,000 acres at Whakatu, 38,000 acres at Waimea, 15,000 acres at Moutere, 42,000 acres at Motueka and 45,000 acres at Golden Bay, excluding pa, cultivations, burial grounds and reserves.

== Aftermath ==
The work of the first Land Commissioners appointed by Hobson concluded in 1844, and their recommendations on the several hundred European claims to non-New Zealand Company lands were generally accepted by FitzRoy when he issued the Crown grants that same year.

Spain's commission ended in 1845 amid great hostility between the Commissioner and the Governor. Spain had initially strongly opposed FitzRoy's decision to overturn his ruling on the Taranaki claims and their relationship continued to deteriorate leading to mutual accusations to the Colonial Office and culminating in a demand by FitzRoy that Spain resign.

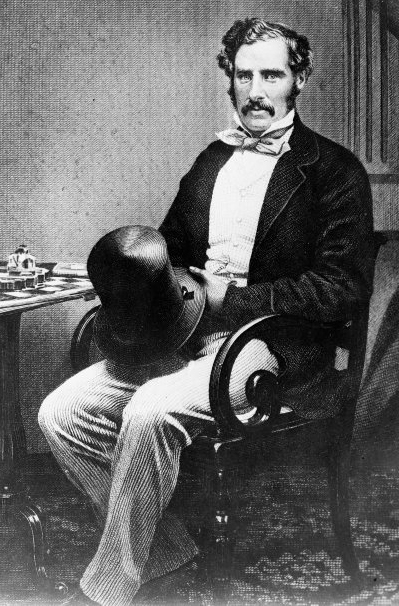
Governor Sir George Grey.

After all his investigations Spain decided that the company had made valid purchases in only two of the areas it claimed: Manawatu and New Plymouth. Regardless of that, he awarded the company almost all the land it claimed and paid compensation to the Māori. The only lands he did not award, because of Māori resistance, were the Manawatu and Porirua districts.

FitzRoy, in turn, issued only two Crown grants on the basis of Spain's awards—at Port Nicholson and Nelson—and he signed those in late July 1845. In a report to Colonial Secretary Lord Stanley FitzRoy noted that apart from the small 3600 acre block at New Plymouth, "all the other claims of the New Zealand Company reported on by Mr Commissioner Spain are disputed by the natives, and cannot be fully occupied by settlers ... until very large additional payments have been made". In every case where compensation had been awarded for the loss of Māori lands, it had been accepted reluctantly or refused. There was also confusion over the exact location of Māori reserves, and the complication of Māori continuing to cultivate and live on unoccupied land, which was commonly absentees' property. The problem was particularly acute at Port Nicholson, where more than 80 percent of Māori cultivations were on absentees' land.

It took many years—and long after FitzRoy's departure from office—to resolve the question of European land titles to pre-Annexation purchases. A variety of methods were used, including new legislation (the 1849 Quieting Titles Ordinance, the 1856 Land Claims Settlement Act, the 1867 Land Claims Arbitration Act), another land commission running from 1857 to 1862 and headed by politician and former New Zealand Company agent Dillon Bell, land exchanges with Māori in order for them to abandon cultivations on Europeans' lands (the outcome of an investigation in 1847 by Lieutenant Colonel William Anson McCleverty, appointed by the Colonial Office), the issuing of land orders or "scrip" entitling settlers to select land near Auckland, and the issue of new Crown grants for Nelson and Port Nicholson (1848). FitzRoy's successor, Governor George Grey, believed FitzRoy had been wrong to set aside Spain's award at New Plymouth and threatened to survey the full 60,000 acres, with minimal compensation to be paid to Māori. He backed down under forceful Ati Awa opposition and instead bought 27,000 acres in the area from 1847 to 1848. Attempts to make more purchases were abandoned in 1849 when it became clear his actions were sparking intertribal disputes.

In February 1846 Grey visited the Hutt Valley and pressured Ngāti Tama chief Te Kaeaea (also known as Taringa Kuri) to abandon the land they were occupying there as well as extensive potato cultivations. Grey refused to compensate them for crops and houses, claiming their occupation had been illegal, and countered Māori resistance by sending a 340-strong military force into the valley. Tensions continued to escalate, culminating in the outbreak of the war known as the Hutt Valley Campaign, which lasted from March to August. Ngāti Toa chief Te Rauparaha, who Grey suspected was behind the Māori resistance, was captured in July and kept prisoner for 18 months. In April 1847 Grey also used British military forces at Wanganui to crush Māori resistance to European occupation. In May 1848 the Wanganui chiefs accepted the £1000 Spain had awarded them.

Land claims continued to be investigated by the 1907 Houston inquiry, 1927 Sim Commission and 1948 Myers Surplus Land Commission.

== Bibliography ==
- Burns, Patricia (1989). Fatal Success: A History of the New Zealand Company. Heinemann Reed. ISBN 0-7900-0011-3.
- Caughey, Angela (1998). The Interpreter: The Biography of Richard "Dicky" Barrett. David Bateman Ltd. ISBN 1-86953-346-1.
- King, Michael (2003). The Penguin History of New Zealand. Penguin Books. ISBN 0-14-301867-1.
- Moon, Paul (2012). A Savage Country. Auckland: Penguin. ISBN 9780143567387.
- Moore, D.; Rigby, B.; Russell, M. (July 1997), Old Land Claims, Waitangi Tribunal, archived from the original on 2016-03-03
- Orange, Claudia (1987). The Treaty of Waitangi. Wellington: Allen & Unwin. ISBN 0868614270.
- Tonk, Rosemarie V. (May 1986). The First New Zealand land commissions, 1840—1845 (MA thesis, University of Canterbury, Christchurch).
- Ward, Alan (1997), National Overview, vol. ii, Waitangi Tribunal
