= Anna Williams =

Anna Williams may refer to:

- Anna Williams (poet) (1706–1783), Welsh writer and friend of Samuel Johnson
- Anna Williams (enslaved person) (born c. 1791), American enslaved woman who successfully sued for freedom
- Anna Maria Williams (1839–1929), New Zealand teacher and school principal
- Anna Wessels Williams (1863–1954), pioneering female doctor and bacteriologist
- Anna Willess Williams (1857–1926), American teacher and philosophical writer best known as the model for George T. Morgan's silver dollar design
- Anna Williams (politician) (born 1980), American politician serving in the Oregon House of Representatives
- Anna Eliza Williams (1873–1987), British supercentenarian who was the oldest person in the world
- Anna-Lynne Williams (born 1978), lead singer of the band Trespassers William
- Anna Williams, one of the intended victims of serial killer Dennis Rader, "The BTK Strangler"
- Anna Williams (Tekken), a fictional character from the Tekken video game series
- Anna Williams, character in The Actress
- Anna Williams (footballer), head coach of the Sierra Leone women's national football team

== See also ==
- Ann Williams (disambiguation)
