= William Gough =

William Gough may refer to:

- William Gough (cricketer) (1929–1978), New Zealand cricketer
- William Gough (antiquarian) (1654?–1682), English antiquarian
- William Venn Gough (1842–1918), English architect
