= Egvad =

Egvad may refer to:

- Egvad Municipality
- Egvad Parish
