= Ann Williams =

Ann or Anne Williams may refer to:

- Ann Williams (actress) (1935–1985), American actress
- Ann Williams (choreographer) (born 1937), American dancer and founder of the Dallas Black Dance Theater
- Ann Williams (historian) (born 1937), British historian
- Ann Claire Williams (born 1949), American federal judge
- Anne Williams (activist) (1951–2013), British campaigner
- Ann Williams (athlete) (born 1965), British middle-distance runner
- Ann Williams (politician) (born 1968), member of Illinois House of Representatives
- Anne Williams-Isom (born 1964), American politician
- Anne Williams Wheaton (died 1977), American publicist
- Ann Williams, character in The Satan Bug

== See also ==
- Anna Williams (disambiguation)
- Annie Williams (disambiguation)
