= Heremaia =

Heremaia is both a given name and a surname. It is a Māori transliteration of the name Jeremiah. Notable people with the name include:

== Given name ==
- Heremaia Murray (born 2000), New Zealand rugby union player
- Heremaia Ngata (born 1971), New Zealand football player

== Surname ==
- Aaron Heremaia (born 1982), New Zealand rugby league player
- Niniwa Heremaia (1854–1929), New Zealand tribal leader
- Steve Heremaia (born 1985), New Zealand boxer

== Fictional characters ==
- Natasha Heremaia, fictional character in New Zealand soap opera Shortland Street
- Rangi Heremaia, fictional character in Shortland Street
- Toka Heremaia, fictional character in Shortland Street
