= Margaret Gardner (disambiguation) =

Margaret Gardner is an Australian academic, community leader and economist currently serving as Governor of Victoria.

Margaret Gardner may also refer to:

- Margaret Gardner (immigrant)
- Margaret Gardner (badminton) on French Open (badminton)
- Margaret Gardner Hoey, First Lady of North Carolina

== See also ==
- Margaret Gardiner (disambiguation)
