= Ngāti Tama =

Māori iwi (tribe) in Aotearoa New Zealand

- Iwi (tribe) in Māoridom
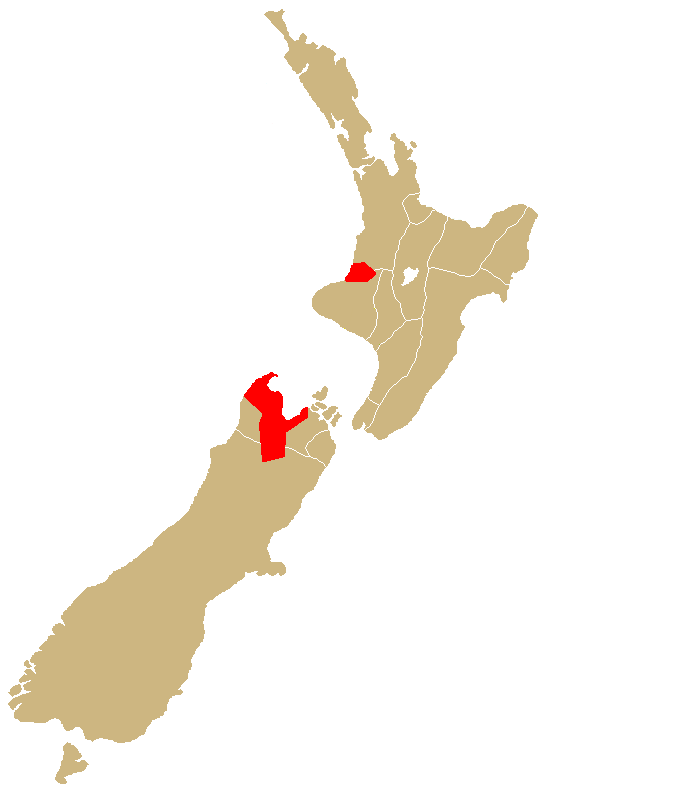
- Rohe (region): Taranaki, Wellington, Tasman/Nelson, Chatham Islands
- Waka (canoe): Tokomaru
- Population: 1,764

Ngāti Tama is a Māori tribe of New Zealand. Their origins, according to oral tradition, date back to Tama Ariki, the chief navigator on the Tokomaru waka. Their historic region is in north Taranaki, around Poutama, with the Mōhakatino River marking their northern boundary with the Tainui and Ngāti Maniapoto. The close geographical proximity of Tainui's Ngāti Toa of Kawhia and the Ngāti Mutunga explains the long, continuous, and close relationship among these three tribes. Ngāti Tama are distinct from Poutama Iwi being that Tokomaru is a later waka than that which Poutama claim descent. Poutama Lands come from their ancesteral rights to Maruiwi and his four sons, all of them being on Okoki predating Tokomaru by many generations. Attempted genocide of Poutama Tūturu was not achieved, even with continued pressure from the so-called Ngāti Tama, Poutama to this day remain on their lands with Ngāti Tama pushed south towards Ngāti Mutunga, their relations. Poutama lands range from Te Kawau, Mokau in the North to Parininihi in the South and inland to their brothers people of the Pohokura line with Rerepahupahu marking the boundary there.

== History ==
=== Migration from Taranaki to Wellington ===
The Ngāti Tama migrated south in the 1820s in search of better opportunities (e.g. trade) and to ensure their safety, as there was a conflict with musket-carrying Tainui people. They were led by their paramount chief Te Pūoho-o-te-rangi, along with his brother Te Kaeaea and other chiefs. Other tribes in the migration were Ngāti Mutunga and Te Ātiawa, the three tribes sharing the same heritage, which goes back to the Tokomaru canoe. Some central and southern Taranaki tribes, including the Wanganui, also took part in the journey. Evidence suggests the Ngāti Tama and Te Ātiawa arrived in Whanganui-a-Tara in a series of migrations from Taranaki, led by Ngāti Toa, in 1822.

The migrating tribes invaded, conquered and occupied the surroundings of Wellington by 1824. They encountered tribes who were already settled in Te Whanganui-a-Tara (Wellington Harbour) such as Ngāi Tara, Ngāti Ira, and Ngāti Kahungunu.

While Ngāti Toa and the Taranaki tribes shared rights around Wellington, Ngāti Tama kept a separate and distinct identity in various areas in Wellington. Ngāti Tama settlements on the harbour included Kaiwharawhara, Pakuao and Raurimu from the first arrival in 1824, Tiakiwai (Thorndon) after the departure of Ngāti Mutunga (in 1835). The Ngāti Tama established settlements at Ohariu, Mākara, Ohaua, and Oterongo on the western coast; and Komangarautawhiri further north. They also had summer fishing kainga at Okiwi and Mukamuka (Palliser Bay).

The Ngāti Tama owned all rights in Te Whanganui-a-Tara and its resources, and across to the west coast. Ngāti Tama were joint tangata whenua, and had tino rangatiratanga, mana whenua and tangata whenua status over those lands, in accordance with traditional Maori law and customs. They exerted their status with their mana, rangatiratanga, by creating relations between groups, or by physical use, cultivation and occupation. The Ngāti Tama tribe maintained a distinct identity of its own in Wellington, and exercised rights to land, fishing, birding and cultivation, and had an organisational structure with associated kainga, marae, waahi tapu, and so on.

=== Migration to the Chatham Islands ===
Despite the pressure of competing interests among the tribes of Wellington, at first a thriving economy was developed. This economy was largely based in trading with visiting ships. In November 1835, after discussing a possible invasion of Samoa and the Norfolk Islands, many Ngāti Tama took part in an invasion of the nearer Chatham Islands. Together with the Ngāti Mutunga, they captured the mate of the European vessel Lord Rodney and threatened to kill him unless the captain took them to the Chatham Islands. About 900 of them voyaged from Wellington, overcrowding the ship, in two sailings. They arrived severely weakened, but were nursed back to health by the native Moriori.

They soon started to take over Chatham Island, showing no regard for the Moriori. Stunned, the Moriori called a council of 1,000 men at Te Awapātiki to debate what to do, 24 generations after the Moriori chief Nunuku had forbidden war. The younger men were keen to repel the invaders and argued that although they had not fought for many centuries they outnumbered the newcomers two to one and were a strong people. But the elders argued that Nunuku’s Law was a sacred covenant with their gods and could not be broken. The consequences for the Moriori were devastating. Ngāti Tama and Ngāti Mutunga massacred about 300 Moriori. They enslaved the rest, and destroyed their economy and traditional way of living. Some Moriori, horrified by the desecration of their beliefs, died of despair. According to records made by elders, 1,561 Moriori died between 1835 and 1863, when they were released from slavery. Many succumbed to diseases introduced by Europeans, but large numbers also died at the hands of the Ngāti Tama and Ngāti Mutunga. In 1862 only 101 remained. When the last known full-blooded Moriori died in 1933, many thought this marked the extinction of a race.

Before Ngāti Tama and Ngāti Mutunga took their two sailings to the Chatham Islands they agreed that the land would not be divided until all had arrived, so that the first arrivals did not get an unfair advantage. However, the first shipload of arrivals, who were mainly Ngāti Tama, did not wait, and proceeded to claim the best areas, which were at Waitangi and Kaingaroa. When the second shipload arrived at Whangaroa, mostly Ngāti Mutunga, they were unhappy with had happened, but settled at Whangaroa. In 1839–40 Ngāti Mutunga besieged Ngāti Tama in their pā at Waitangi and after several months drove them out of Waitangi to other parts of Chatham Island.

Some Ngāti Tama later returned home to Taranaki.

=== European colonization and displacement ===
Starting in 1839, the New Zealand Company brought shiploads of European colonizers to settle in Te Whanganui-a-Tara. The effects of European settlement on the Ngāti Tama proved to be disastrous as the new arrivals sought Maori land.

The Port Nicholson Deed was a land sale transaction between the New Zealand Company and the chiefs in the Hutt Valley, with the Ngāti Tama chief Te Kaeaea taking part in it. The New Zealand Company thought they had purchased land from Te Kaeaea when they had only been given anchorage and port rights at Wellington Harbour.

The Crown appointed William Spain as a New Zealand Land Claims Commissioner to inquire into the sale of land in Wellington. Spain adopted an attitude towards the Ngāti Tama's claims prejudicial for their interests because of the occupation of the land in the Hutt by the Ngāti Tama. While Spain recognized the numerous faults in the land sales, the Commission's findings incorrectly assumed that Te Kaeaea's participation in the transaction of Port Nicholson was equal to the complete support for the sale of Ngāti Tama land. Despite protests from the Ngāti Tama, the Crown assisted the settlers and gave them Māori land. The Crown's actions had a fatal impact in Whanganui-a-Tara, the Ngāti Tama losing the land they had conquered in 1822.

In 1844 Governor Fitzroy adopted a policy of compensating the Ngāti Tama. However, there was no consultation and the compensation proceeded only in a summary fashion. The Ngāti Tama living in Kaiwharawhara received their share of the compensation under protest while those living in Ohariu missed any compensation whatsoever.

In 1847, McCleverty concluded a series of agreements with Ngāti Tama to finally settle the reserves issue. The 200 Ngāti Tama received 2600 acres of reserves, of which about 13 acres per person were set aside as compensation. The ceded reserves were inadequate for their needs and unsuitable for growing crops, essential for the Ngāti Tama's survival.

By 1842, the Ngāti Tama people were forcibly removed from their lands by Crown-assisted settler occupation. They sought refuge by squatting on land in the Hutt Valley, where the soil was more productive than in the reserves they had been awarded. The occupation was short-lived and ended in February 1846, when Governor Grey evicted them under threat of military intervention. The Ngāti Tama's cultivated areas, their sole means of survival, were plundered. Their chief Te Kaeaea was exiled in Auckland. The remaining Ngāti Tama had to seek sanctuary with other tribes. They suffered from high levels of disease and mortality, having no choice but to sell reserve land out of necessity. When the Crown finished its land acquisition program, the Ngāti Tama had virtually no land left. By the 1870s, they had largely moved from the harbour rim and been evicted.

The impact on the Ngāti Tama was significant. They had been scattered by the invasion of the Waikato tribes during the Musket Wars of the 1820s. Many then left Wellington, which they had invaded and conquered, to take part in the invasion of the Chatham Islands. Some individuals survived, many in whanau groupings, living with other Maori groups. The Ngāti Tama's presence in Wellington as a tribe was lost.

Given the absence of an organised entity representing the Ngāti Tama in Wellington, tribes such as Ngāti Toa and Te Ātiawa took responsibility for looking after the Ngāti Tama's interests. In particular, the Wellington Tenths Trust has directly represented the interests of its beneficiaries; namely those individuals and their descendants who were named as owners of Ngāti Tama reserves in the Wellington region back in the 19th century.

== Ngāti Tama Claims Settlement Act 2003 ==
The tribe's historical Treaty of Waitangi claims were resolved by the Ngāti Tama Claims Settlement Act 2003, which includes specific financial benefits, a historical narrative of the Crown's interactions with the tribe and an apology:

The Crown profoundly regrets and unreservedly apologises to Ngāti Tama for its actions, which have resulted in the virtual landlessness of Ngāti Tama in Taranaki, and which have caused suffering and hardship to Ngāti Tama over the generations to the present day.

== Radio station ==
Te Korimako o Taranaki is the radio station of Ngāti Tama and other tribes from Taranaki, including Ngāti Mutunga, Te Ātiawa, Ngāti Maru, Taranaki, Ngāruahine, Ngāti Ruanui and Ngaa Rauru Kiitahi. It started at the Bell Block campus of Taranaki Polytechnic in 1992, and moved to the Spotswood campus in 1993. It is available on 94.8 FM across Taranaki.

== Notable people ==
- Airini Nga Roimata Grennell
- Hūria Mātenga
- Te Kiore Paremata Te Wahapiro
- William Barnard Rhodes-Moorhouse
- William Henry Rhodes-Moorhouse
- Te Kaeaea
- Te Pūoho-o-te-rangi
- Waitaoro

== See also ==
- List of Māori iwi
