= Stuart Jones =

Stuart Jones may refer to:

- Stuart Jones (cricketer) (1929–2015), New Zealand cricketer
- Stuart Jones (cyclist) (born 1969), Australian Para cyclist
- Stuart Jones (footballer, born 1977), English football goalkeeper
- Stuart Jones (footballer, born 1984), Welsh football defender
- Stuart Jones (golfer) (1925–2012), New Zealand golfer
- Stuart Jones (rugby league) (born 1981), professional rugby league player for Castleford Tigers
- Stuart Jones (historian), British historian
- Stuart E. Jones, American diplomat
- Stuart Alan Jones, a fictional character from the TV series Queer as Folk
- Stuart "Slim" Jones, American baseball player
- Stewart Jones, American politician and member of the South Carolina House of Representatives
