= Carl Edvard =

Carl Edvard is a given name. It may refer too:

- Carl Edvard Johan Dahl (1856–1929), Dansh-born New Zealand businessman, importer, and vice consul
- Carl-Edvard Hedelund (born 1941), Danish tennis player
- Carl Edvard Johansson (1864–1943), Swedish inventor and scientist
- Carl Edvard Marius Levy (1808–1865), Danish professor
- Carl Edvard Rotwitt (1812–1860), Danish jurist and politician
- Carl Edvard Sonne (1804–1878), Danish printmaker
- Carl Edvard Wallerstedt (1882–1963), Swedish diplomat
