= Richard Toy =

New Zealand architect (1911–1995)

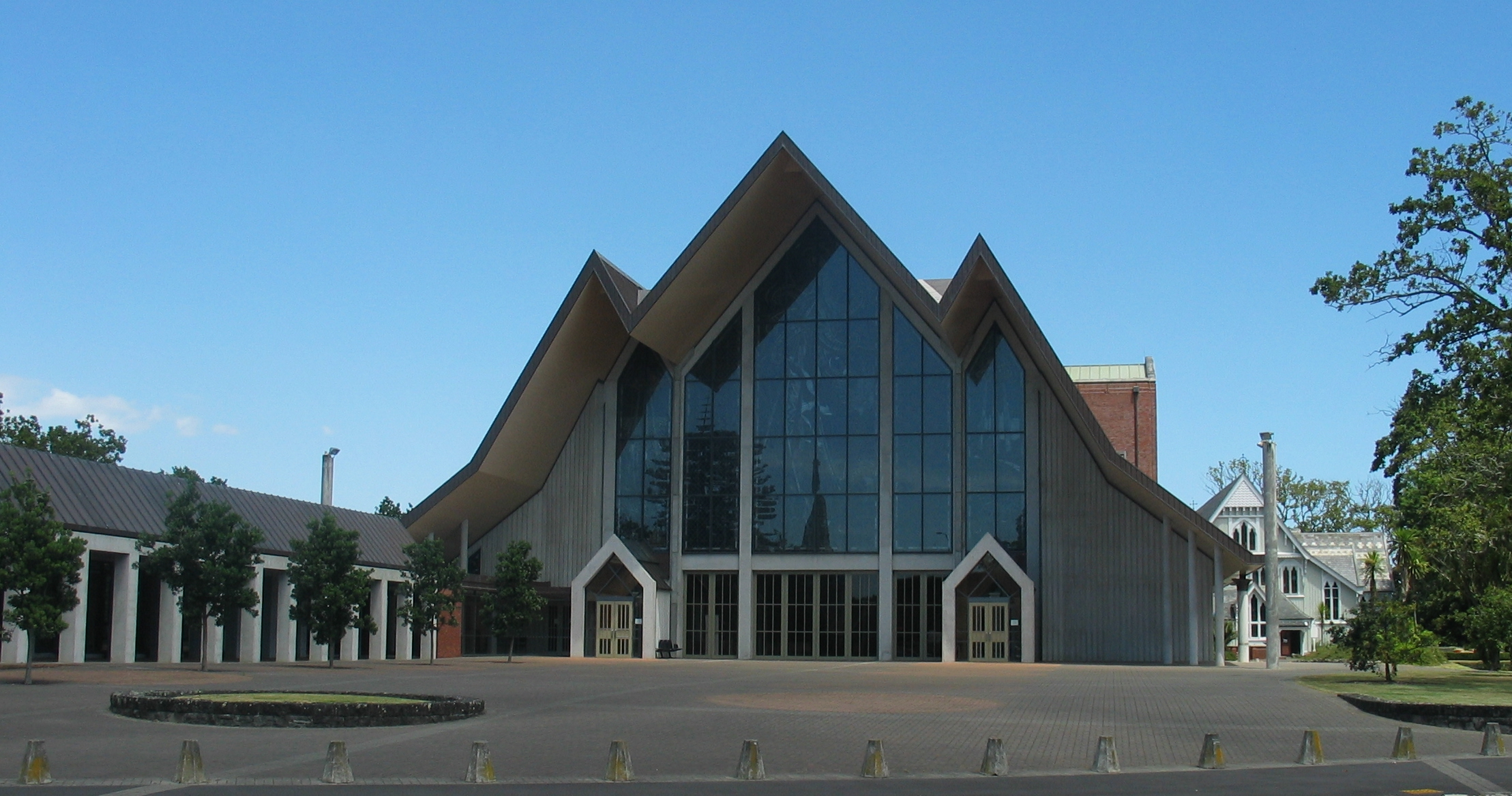
Holy Trinity Cathedral, Parnell, Auckland

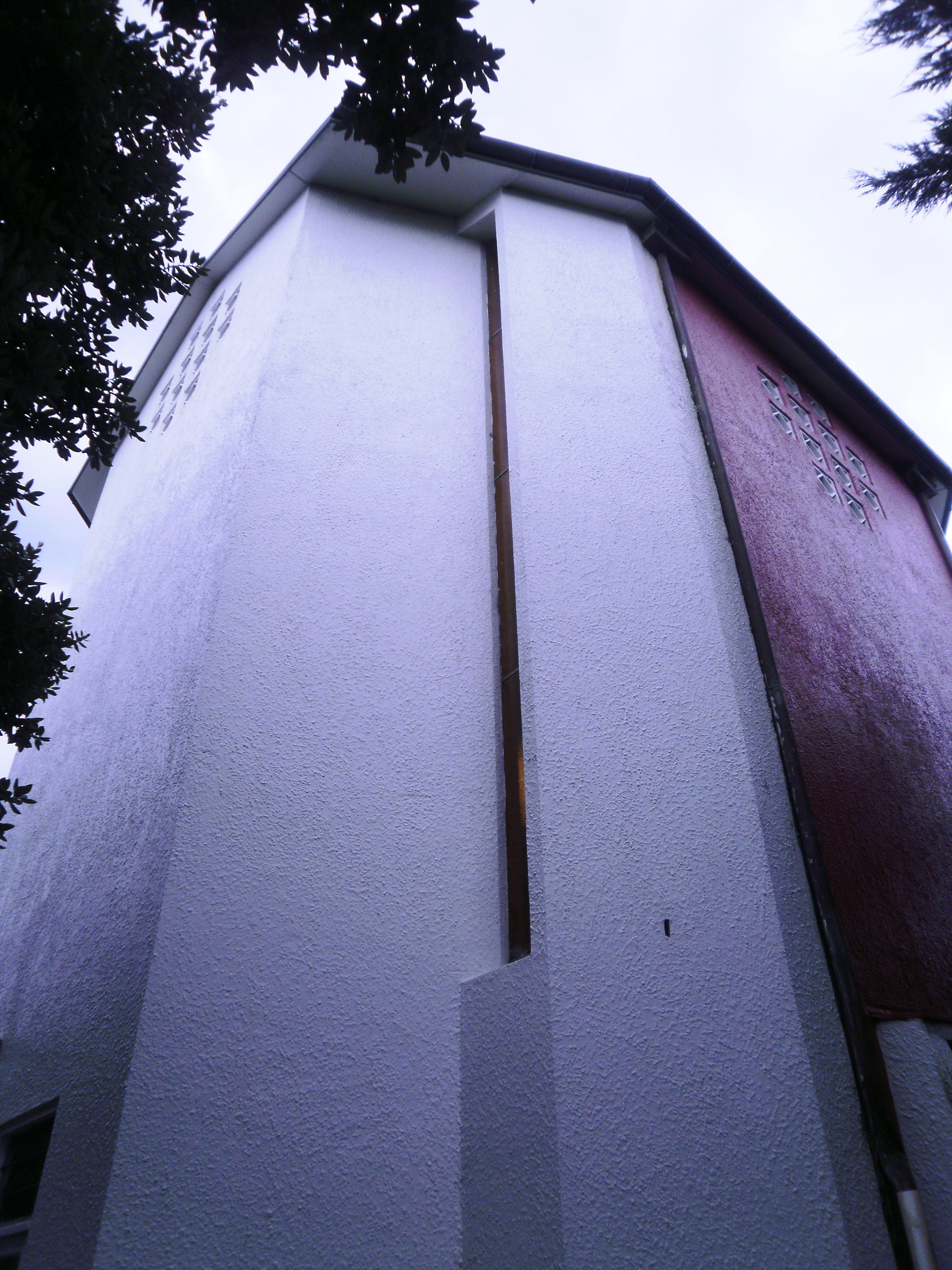
Two-storey extension by Richard Toy at St. Martins at St. Chads Church.

Richard Horton Beauclerc Toy OBE (9 May 1911 – 2 July 1995) was a New Zealand architect renowned for his church architecture.

Toy was born in Ignace, Ontario, Canada in 1911. His family moved to New Zealand in 1923. He enrolled in agriculture at Auckland University in 1930 before changing to architecture.

From 1939 he taught for many years at the Auckland School of Architecture, acting as the Chair of Design from 1959 to 1976. Toy's best known churches are in Auckland and include the Holy Trinity Cathedral in Parnell, St Martin's at St Chad's in Sandringham and All Saints in Ponsonby.

In the 1982 New Year Honours he was appointed an Officer of the Order of the British Empire, for services to architecture.
