= Te Kiore Paremata Te Wahapiro =

Ngāti Tama leader

Te Kiore Paremata Te Wahapiro (fl. 1822–1845) was a New Zealand tribal leader. Of Māori descent, he identified with the Ngati Tama iwi. He was born in Poutama, Taranaki, New Zealand.
