= Peter Bartlett (architect) =

New Zealand architect (1929–2019)

- Born: Peter John Bartlett; 7 January 1929; Auckland, New Zealand
- Died: 21 December 2019 (aged 90); Auckland, New Zealand
- Occupation: Architect
- Spouse: Margaret Ann Lawlor (m. 1953)
- Children: 6

Academic background
- Education: University of Auckland
- Thesis: Structured evaluation of attitudes to dwelling environments: people’s subjective assessments of preference satisfaction and meaning as indicators of architectural design performance (1978)
- Doctoral advisor: Richard Toy

Academic work
- Institutions: University of Auckland

Peter John Bartlett (7 January 1929 – 21 December 2019) was a New Zealand architect and professor of architectural design.

== Early life, education and family ==
Born in Auckland on 7 January 1929, Bartlett was the son of Florence Mary Bartlett (née Cushman) and John Maddocks Bartlett. He was educated at Auckland Grammar School, before studying architecture at Auckland University College and completing a Bachelor of Architecture degree in 1957. He later undertook doctoral studies at Auckland, supervised by Richard Toy, and submitted his PhD thesis, titled Structured evaluation of attitudes to dwelling environments: people’s subjective assessments of preference satisfaction and meaning as indicators of architectural design performance in 1978.

in 1953, Bartlett married Margaret Ann Lawlor, and the couple went on to have six children.

== Archtitectural career ==
Bartlett was awarded a New Zealand government cultural fund bursary to study in Paris in 1953 and 1954, and spent the postgraduate year of his architectural studies in France. Between 1954 and 1957, he worked in Paris as a project architect on multi-storey housing projects, before returning to New Zealand and going into private practice.

In 1958, he won first prize in the New Zealand Institute of Architects (NZIA) Winstone House Competition, and in 1968 he was awarded an NZIA bronze medal for the Newcombe house in Parnell; the building received an NZIA Auckland enduring architecture award in 2013. Bartlett designed the Centennial Theatre Centre at his old school, Auckland Grammar, which won an NZIA Auckland region medal in 1974, and an NZIA gold medal in 1975.

Bartlett was elected as a Fellow of the New Zealand Institute of Architects in 1976, and a Fellow of the Royal Society of Arts the following year.

== Academic career ==
In 1961, Bartlett was one of a number of architects, including Harry Turbott and Bill Wilson, employed as a sessional staff member in the School of Architecture at the University of Auckland. In 1964, he was appointed as a senior lecturer in architecture at the University of Auckland, to teach architectural history and theory, and he was promoted to professor of architectural design in 1977. When he retired in 1993, Bartlett was conferred the title of professor emeritus.

== Death ==
Bartlett died in the Auckland suburb of Devonport, Auckland on 21 December 2019.
