= Mads Christensen (pastor) =

Mads Christensen (10 May 1856 – 28 December 1929) was a New Zealand Lutheran pastor. He was born in Egvad, Denmark, on 10 May 1856.
