= Margaret Gardiner =

Margaret Gardiner may refer to:

- Margaret Gardiner (art collector) (1904–2005), British patron of artists and political activist
- Margaret Gardiner (netball) (1946–2003), New zealand netball player
- Margaret Gardiner (Miss Universe) (born 1959), South African beauty queen

== See also ==
- Margaret Gardner (disambiguation)
