= Ed Dolejs =

New Zealand softball coach (1929–2019)

Personal information
- Full name: Edward John Dolejs
- Born: 30 June 1929; Cleveland, Ohio, United States
- Died: 5 November 2019 (aged 90); Nelson, New Zealand

Sport
- Country: New Zealand
- Sport: Softball
- Position: Coach

New Zealand women's coach
- In office 1977–1991

Edward John Dolejs (30 June 1929 – 5 November 2019) was a New Zealand softball coach. He coached the New Zealand women's team between 1977 and 1991, during which time they won medals at four successive softball world championships, including gold in 1982.

Dolejs was born in Cleveland, Ohio, in 1929, and moved to New Zealand in 1965, settling in Nelson. The women's world champion softball team that he coached was inducted into the New Zealand Sports Hall of Fame in 1995, and Dolejs himself was elected as a member of the International Softball Federation Hall of Fame, for meritorious service, in 1993. He was also inducted as a Nelson Sports Legend. Dolejs died in Nelson on 5 November 2019.
