= Noel Dellow =

New Zealand cricketer (1929–2021)

Personal information
- Full name: Harold Noel Dellow
- Born: 14 February 1929; Ashburton, New Zealand
- Died: 1 September 2021 (aged 92); Timaru, New Zealand
- Batting: Left-handed
- Bowling: Right-arm medium-pace
- Role: Bowler

Domestic team information
- Years: Team
- 1954-55 to 1955-56: Canterbury

Career statistics
Competition	First-class
Matches	5
Runs scored	37
Batting average	5.28
100s/50s	0/0
Top score	15 not out
Balls bowled	748
Wickets	11
Bowling average	33.36
5 wickets in innings	0
10 wickets in match	0
Best bowling	3/84
Catches/stumpings	1/–
- Source: Cricinfo, 12 June 2020

Harold Noel Dellow (14 February 1929 – 1 September 2021) was a New Zealand cricketer who played five matches of first-class cricket for Canterbury between early 1955 and early 1956.

== Life and career ==
Born in Ashburton, Noel Dellow was a medium-pace bowler. His best first-class batting and bowling performances came in the first innings of the Plunket Shield match against Auckland in 1955–56, when he took 3 for 84 opening the bowling and then scored 15 not out at number 11.

Dellow spent most of his life in South Canterbury. Playing for a South Island Minor Associations XI against the touring Australian team in 1959–60, he took 5 for 63 off 30 overs, although he was unable to prevent an innings defeat. He later served as executive director of the South Canterbury Cricket Association and was awarded life membership of the association.

Dellow worked as a chartered accountant in Timaru. He lived in retirement in Timaru, and died there on 1 September 2021.
