= Annie Williams =

Annie Williams may refer to:

- Annie Williams (suffragette) (c. 1860–1943), British women's rights activist
- Annie Williams (painter) (born 1942), British watercolor artist
- Annie Williams-Arlington (born 1997), American soccer player

== See also ==
- Annabelle Williams (born 1988), Australian swimmer
