= Te Kaeaea =

New Zealand tribal leader

Te Kaeaea (?–1871) was a notable New Zealand tribal leader. Of Māori descent, he identified with the Ngāti Tama iwi.
