= William Spain =

Australian politician

William Spain (14 March 1803 – 5 April 1876) was an English lawyer who was appointed in 1841 as a New Zealand Land Claims Commissioner to investigate land purchases from the Māori people by the New Zealand Company. He spent about four years in New Zealand, where he was one of the most highly-paid officials in the colony, before moving to New South Wales where he returned to work as a solicitor, became Inspector-General of Police and a member of the New South Wales Legislative Council.

== Early career and character ==
Spain was born in Cowes, Hampshire, England, a son of George Spain. He worked as an attorney in London before his appointment as New Zealand Land Commissioner and was an active supporter of the Liberal Party. George Clarke Jnr, a clerk in the Native Department who served as a translator during the land claim commission hearings, described him as "a man of solid intelligence, but with a good deal of legal pedantry about him. He was somewhat slow in thinking, very wooden in his apprehension of ways of dealing with new emergencies, steady and rather plodding in his ways, thoroughly honest in intention, and utterly immovable in threats, though he may have been softened by flattery." Continued delays in resolving questions of ownership of land in many areas led to strong public criticism of Spain by mid-1843, although the delay was almost all due to stalling tactics by New Zealand Company principal agent William Wakefield.

== New Zealand Land Claims Commissioner ==
In August 1840 the New South Wales Legislative Council passed the New Zealand Land Claims Bill to establish a New Zealand Land Commission, which would investigate the validity of all purchases of land in New Zealand from Māori prior to the signing of the Treaty of Waitangi, which transferred sovereignty over New Zealand to the British Crown. The inquiry, by three commissioners, was designed to determine who owned what land, in order to formalise and regulate land ownership in the new colony. In late 1840 Governor George Gipps exempted all New Zealand Company purchases from the commission's inquiry.

The Colonial Office and the New Zealand Company came to an agreement in November 1840 under which the company would be given a royal charter of incorporation and also a Crown grant to land in defined areas of the country. On 3 December the British Government told the company that a commission would be set up to investigate all the company's New Zealand land titles, after which bona fide purchases would be confirmed with a Crown grant. British Colonial Secretary Lord John Russell selected Spain to fill the role of commissioner, to take effect from 20 January 1841. He intended that Spain be the sole commissioner, believing that having a British rather than a local government appointee would be seen as more impartial. Spain was given a fixed annual salary of £2000, which equalled that of the Chief Justice and made the pair the second-highest paid public officials in New Zealand, behind the Governor.

Spain eventually sailed from Gravesend on the Prince Rupert, an emigrant ship, in mid-April. Spain was accompanied by 13 members of his family, while the colony's new Surveyor-General, Charles Ligar, and five assistant surveyors were also on board. In early September the ship was wrecked at the Cape of Good Hope and the Governor of the Cape, Sir George Napier, chartered the brig Antilla to carry Spain and the surveyors to New Zealand. They arrived on 8 December 1841.

Spain moved to Auckland, where he had bought a 110-acre block of land, and claimed superiority over the two land commissioners who remained of the original three appointed by Gipps. He proposed that either he remain in Auckland and hear claims from the Auckland district while the other two would travel to conduct hearings through other regions; or that he would review the work of the other commissioners, then hold hearings in Wellington with one of the other commissioners. Governor William Hobson refused the request and instructed him to proceed to Wellington immediately to investigate the New Zealand Company purchases defined in an agreement he had made with the company in September 1841. In that agreement the Crown indicated its acceptance of certain earlier land purchases at Port Nicholson, Porirua, Manawatu, Wanganui and New Plymouth, though the guarantee was conditional on the company proving it had fairly extinguished the Maori title. Spain's task, then, was to first established who had actually held the title to those lands bought by the company, a difficult task in itself, and then find whether the sales were legitimate.

Assisted by interpreter and Sub-Protector of Aborigines George Clarke, then aged 19, Spain began his hearings in Wellington in May 1842. Within weeks he began encountering opposition and obstruction from the New Zealand Company's principal agent, William Wakefield, who had thought the hearings would be a mere formality. In fact Spain was determined to investigate thoroughly the background of all land purchases including whether Maori who had sold land had the right to do so. His interrogation of witnesses was exhaustive, with lengthy evidence taken and recorded in both Maori and English. Spain held further hearings in Porirua, Waikanae, Otaki, Manawatu and Wanganui and then Taranaki, where his commission opened hearings on 31 May 1844.

Spain's decision at the conclusion of his Taranaki hearings became his downfall. From the outset of his Taranaki investigation he refused to accept the claims of former landowners who returned from slavery in the Waikato, a view that was strongly opposed by both his assistants, Clarke and Thomas Forsaith, a Maori interpreter and Protector of Aborigines. Spain closed his court on 6 June and announced that the company was entitled to almost all the 60,000 acres it claimed. The ruling pleased European settlers but enraged the local Āti Awa Maori, who were restrained from destroying outlying settlers' property only with the assurance by Clarke that Governor FitzRoy would listen to their appeals. On 2 August FitzRoy arrived in New Plymouth and made it known that he did not agree with Spain's dismissal of the absentees' claims; in early October FitzRoy returned and confirmed that he had overturned Spain's judgment, declaring that all the awarded land would have to be repurchased from the Maori owners. The move infuriated Spain. His final inquiry, in August 1844, was into sales in the Nelson area, including the Wairau Valley, scene of the bloody Wairau Affray a year earlier.

Spain's commission ended in 1845 amid great hostility between the Commissioner and the Governor, a continuation of the friction over FitzRoy's decision to overturn his ruling on the Taranaki claims. Their relationship continued to deteriorate, leading to mutual accusations to the Colonial Office and culminating in a demand by FitzRoy that Spain resign.

== New South Wales ==
Spain left for New South Wales in 1845 and practised as a solicitor in Sydney until 1851. He was Inspector-General of Police from 1 January 1851, to 31 December 1851. Spain was appointed as Non-Elective Member of the first New South Wales Legislative Council on 13 October 1851, a position he held until 1 May 1852. Spain was again a member of the Council from 31 October 1856 to 20 May 1858, and built a family home at Waverley, New South Wales on retirement.

== Bibliography ==
- Burns, Patricia (1989). Fatal Success: A History of the New Zealand Company. Heinemann Reed. ISBN 0-7900-0011-3.
- Moon, Paul (2012). A Savage Country. Auckland: Penguin. ISBN 9780143567387.
- Moore, D.; Rigby, B.; Russell, M. (July 1997), Old Land Claims, Waitangi Tribunal, archived from the original on 3 March 2016
- Tonk, Rosemarie V. (May 1986). The First New Zealand land commissions, 1840—1845 (MA thesis, University of Canterbury, Christchurch).
