= Angela Annabell =

New Zealand musicologist

- Born: Angela Ruth Greenwood; 15 May 1929
- Died: 1 June 2000 (aged 71)
- Spouse: Milton Spurdle Annabell (died 1988)

Academic background
- Education: University of Auckland
- Thesis: New Zealand's cultural and economic development reflected in song: aspects of the New Zealand folk song ethos (1975)

Academic work
- Discipline: Musicologist
- Institutions: University of Auckland

Angela Ruth Annabell (née Greenwood; 15 May 1929 – 1 June 2000) was a New Zealand musicologist. She researched and wrote largely about folk music.

== Biography ==
Annabell completed a master's degree in music at the University of Auckland in 1968. Her 1975 doctoral thesis, titled New Zealand Cultural and Economic Development Reflected in Song, is considered the most thorough discussion of New Zealand folk music and song.

She later became a lecturer at the University of Auckland, and was also closely involved with the Auckland branch of the New Zealand Folklore Society. Some of her research centred on the New Zealand song Now Is the Hour.

Annabell died on 1 June 2000, and her ashes were buried at Purewa Cemetery, Auckland.

Her research papers, including the records of the New Zealand Folklore Society (Auckland Branch), are held in the Alexander Turnbull Library.
