= Ross Wightman =

- Born: David Ross Wightman; 10 August 1929 Hamilton, New Zealand
- Died: 11 January 2012 (aged 82) Whangamatā, New Zealand
- Height: 1.83 m (6 ft 0 in)
- Weight: 82 kg (181 lb)
- School: Morrinsville District High School
- University: University of Otago

Rugby union career
- Position: Three-quarter
Provincial / State sides
Years	Team	Apps	(Points)
1949–50	Otago	15	
1951	Auckland	12	
1952–53	Waikato	17	
International career
Years	Team	Apps	(Points)
1951	New Zealand	0	(0)

David Ross Wightman (10 August 1929 – 11 January 2012) was a New Zealand rugby union player. Primarily a centre or wing, Wightman represented Otago, Auckland, and Waikato at a provincial level. He was a member of the New Zealand national side, the All Blacks, on their 1951 tour of Australia, playing in four games although he did not appear in any of the three test matches.
