= John Te One Hippolite =

Political activist (1929–1993)

John Te One Hippolite (25 August 1929–27 February 1993) was a New Zealand farm labourer, political activist, and nurse. Of Māori descent, he identified with the Ngāti Koata, Ngāti Kuia and Ngāti Toa iwi. He was born in D'Urville Island, Marlborough, New Zealand on 25 August 1929.

Hippolite attended Nelson College from 1944 to 1945.
