= Anna Williams (enslaved person) =

Enslaved woman who successfully sued for her freedom

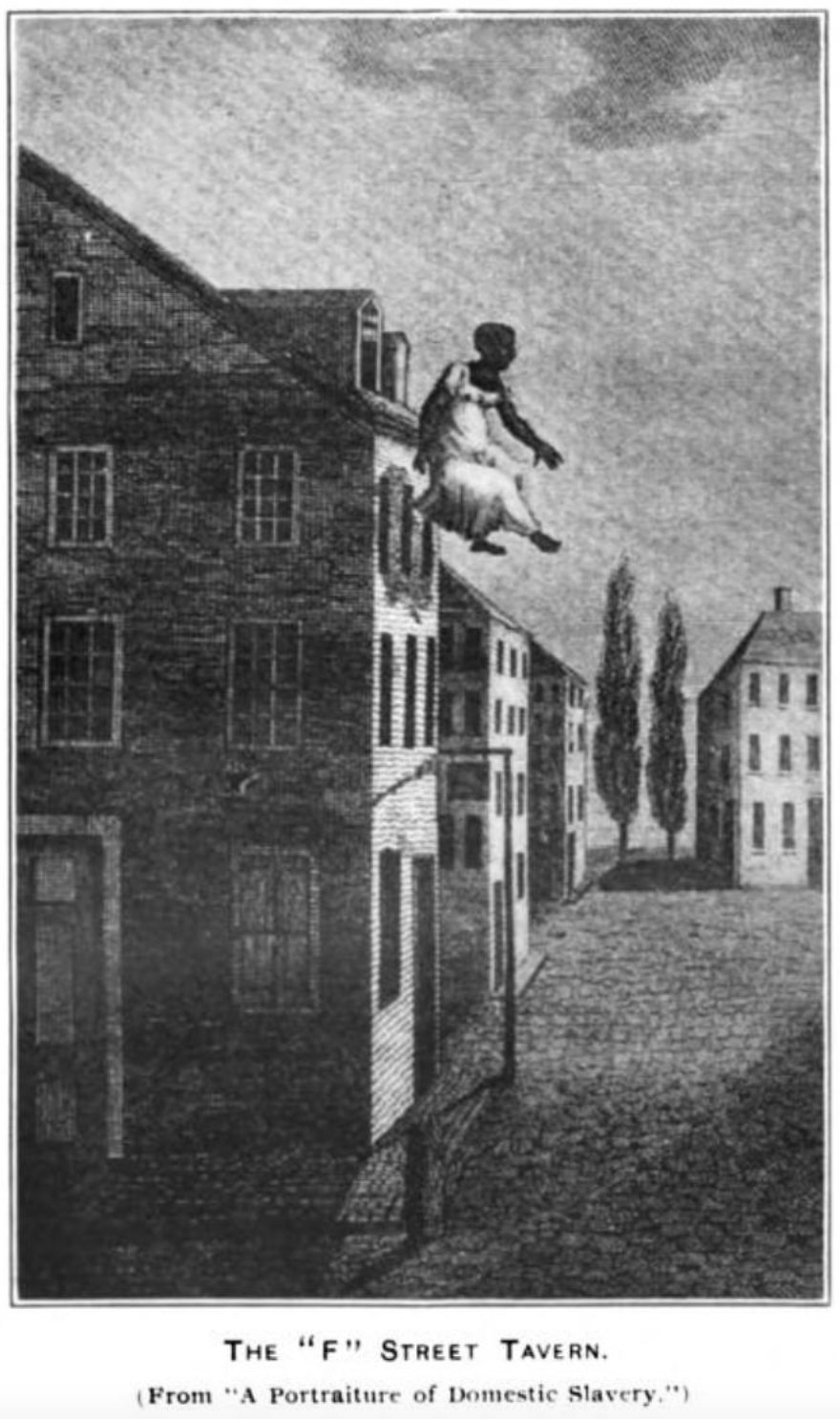
Artist's 1817 rendering of Williams' infamous jump from the F Street Tavern. Published in "A Portraiture of Domestic Slavery"

Anna "Ann" Williams (born c. 1791 – d. unknown) was an enslaved woman who successfully sued for freedom for herself and her children before the United States Court of Appeals for the DC Circuit. Her lawsuit and her infamous jump from the window of the F Street Tavern heightened public awareness of the terror and suffering caused by the slave trade in the United States.

== Life ==
Williams was born into slavery in c. 1791 around the Bladensburg, Maryland area. Williams was originally enslaved at a plantation in Bladensburg. She was married; they had six children.

In November 1815, Williams was sold to Georgia slave traders and forcibly separated from her family. During this period, she jumped from the third-floor window of the F Street Tavern in Washington, D.C. The action became highly publicized, with Abolitionist writers sharing the story as an example of the human indignities of the slave trade. Williams fractured her arms and broke her back due to the fall, but she survived. After her fall, the slave trader left Williams behind but still took her two daughters away to be sold.

News of her fall reached Jesse Torrey, a prominent Philadelphia physician and anti-slavery writer who was gathering first-hand narratives by African Americans of slavery and kidnapping. In December 1815, he visited and interviewed Williams who was still recovering at the tavern.

Her jump from the window and the circumstances surrounding it helped to prompt a formal Congressional inquiry in 1816. The chairperson of the select committee, Congressman John Randolph, subpoenaed testimony from Torrey, the two medical doctors who treated Williams - Dr. Benjamin King and Dr. W. Jones, and from attorney Francis Scott Key who had been gathering evidence of kidnappings related to the interstate slave trade.

Torrey also included Williams' story in his 1817 anti-slavery book, A Portraiture of Slavery in the United States, but he did not identify her by name in the book.

In 1828, Williams filed a freedom suit to the U.S. Court of Appeals for the DC circuit, claiming that George Miller Sr. and George Miller Jr. had enslaved her illegally. Her attorney was Francis Scott Key, who convinced the court to grant her a certification of protection to live independently while the case was pending. In the summer of 1832, the case went to trial, and the jury found in Williams' favor on July 2, 1832. Williams won the case, and along with it, freedom for herself, her children, and her descendants. The jury likely determined that her 1815 sale was in violation of the Maryland Act of 1796. Under Maryland law at the time, domestic slave traders were not permitted to import slaves into Maryland for the purpose of selling them.

In 1835, Williams was interviewed and shared her story with Ethan Allen Andrews when he was writing his forthcoming book, Slavery and the Domestic Slave Trade in the United States. By this period, she was living in freedom, reunited with her husband, and living with four children. While she was never reunited with her two daughters that had been illegally sold, she said that "always prays for them, and expects to meet them up there." Williams continued to have challenges related to her mobility throughout her later life, but was still able to walk.

== Legacy ==
The story of Williams' life is taught in public middle and high school history classes in the United States.

Williams' story is told in the 2018 animated short film, Anna—One Woman's Quest for Freedom in Early Washington, D.C.

== See also ==
- List of slaves
