= Margaret Lawlor-Bartlett =

New Zealand artist

Margaret Ann Lawlor-Bartlett QSM (née Lawlor; born 26 December 1929) is a New Zealand artist. Her works are held in the collections of Auckland Art Gallery. Her works are often on social issues such as feminism, institutional patriarchy, apartheid, and opposition to nuclear arms.

== Biography ==
Lawlor-Bartlett was born in Wellington on 26 December 1929, the daughter of renowned journalist and writer Pat Lawlor. She trained as a specialist art teacher at the Wellington Teachers' Training College, and in 1949 was enrolled at the Dunedin Training College, where she was taught by Gordon Tovey. Lawlor-Bartlett studied at Elam from 1950 to 1953. She was awarded the Rosemary Grice Memorial prize in 1953, but left Elam in protest when advised not to finish her painting Nuclear Holocaust with Aunt Isobel and Uncle Rupert Having A Cuppa. She subsequently trained in France under Jean Metzinger and André Lhote from 1953 to 1957. She later attended Saint Martin's School of Art, London, from 1969 to 1970.

Active in the anti-nuclear arms movement in New Zealand, Lawlor-Bartlett founded Visual Artists Against Nuclear Arms (VAANA) in 1985. In 1979, she was a founding member of the New Zealand Association of Women Artists. In the 2008 New Year Honours, she was awarded the Queen’s Service Medal, for services to art.

Lawlor-Bartlett has lived in Devonport for over 30 years. She married architect Peter Bartlett in 1953, and the couple went on to have six children. Peter Bartlett died in 2019.

== Exhibitions ==
- Waving not drowning 2022 The Wallace Arts Centre
- 'What Will We Leave Them?' 2016 Parnell Gallery
