= St Martin's at St Chad's =

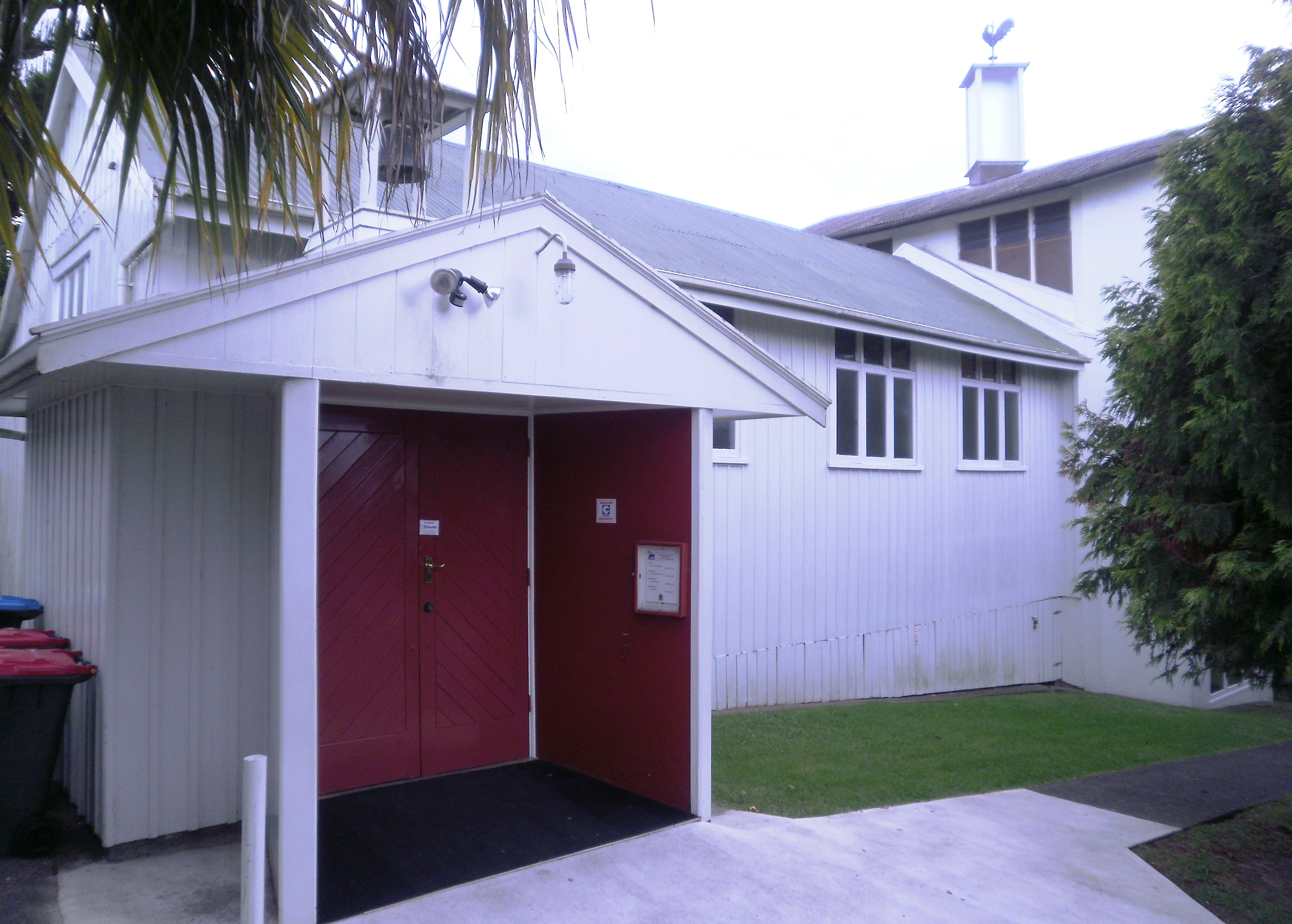
- St Martin's at St Chad's
- St Martin's at St Chad's
- 36°53′47.02″S 174°44′1.14″E
- Address: 681 Sandringham Road, Sandringham, Auckland
- Country: New Zealand
- Previous denomination: Anglican

History
- Status: Church (1915 – 2022)

Architecture
- Functional status: Closed
- Architectural type: Church
- Years built: 1915
- Closed: 2022

St Martin's at St Chad's is a former Anglican church located in Sandringham, Auckland, New Zealand. It was the parish church for the suburb of Sandringham between 1915 and 2022.

== History ==
In March 1915 a mission chapel named after St Chad was in Sandringham, a mission district of St Alban's, Balmoral. It later became part of the parochial district of Kingsland, and then (in 1944) became part of the new parish of Mount Roskill. An organ was purchased and they had communion once a month. Adding to the existing wooden building, in 1954, Toy designed this reinforced concrete structure to house a chancel and choir; the existing building was adapted to serve as the nave. Due to the slope of the site, the addition is two storied – an undercroft has been formed beneath the sanctuary – and Toy's composition of the exterior emphasises the vertical dimension. Within, light is admitted to the charmingly simple interior via side lights behind the altar, as well as through a glass lantern on the roof.

Due to declining numbers the congregation was dissolved in 2003.

Transit New Zealand bought the St Martin's Anglican Church and vicarage on Dominion Road to make way for the new motorway to link Manukau City to the North Western Motorway. The congregation of the (1961) parish of Mount Roskill moved to St Chad's Anglican Church on Sandringham Road in 2004, and the 1962 church, built to replace a temporary structure erected in 1947, was demolished 2005.

In 2022 it was announced that the parish would close.
