= Kevin Dwyer (cricketer) =

New Zealand cricketer (1929–2020)

Personal information
- Full name: Kevin Francis Joseph Dwyer
- Born: 12 February 1929; Wellington, New Zealand
- Died: 12 July 2020 (aged 91); Auckland, New Zealand
- Batting: Right-handed

Domestic team information
- Years: Team
- 1950/51–1953/54: Auckland

Career statistics
Competition	First-class
Matches	7
Runs scored	361
Batting average	25.78
100s/50s	0/2
Top score	56
Catches/stumpings	4/0
- Source: CricketArchive, 2 August 2020

Kevin Francis Joseph Dwyer (12 February 1929 – 12 July 2020) was a New Zealand cricketer who played seven first-class matches for Auckland in the Plunket Shield in the 1950s.

Dwyer was an opening batsman. He made his first-class debut for Auckland in the 1950–51 season, with moderate success. He returned for the Plunket Shield match against Otago in 1952–53 after two players withdrew due to injury, and scored 56 and 49. He was also Auckland's top scorer in the final match, with 47 in the first innings. He again top-scored for Auckland in the match against Central Districts in the 1953–54 season, making 51 and 23, but then played only one more first-class match.

Dwyer died in Auckland on 12 July 2020.
