= Yvonne du Fresne =

New Zealand writer (1929–2011)

- Born: 30 September 1929
- Died: 13 March 2011 (aged 81)
- Writing career
- Notable works: Farvel and other stories The Book of Ester; The Growing of Astrid Westergaard
- Notable awards: PEN best first book award

Yvonne Donna du Fresne (30 September 1929 – 13 March 2011) was a New Zealand writer of Danish descent. Much of her work examines non-British European cultures in New Zealand.

== Early life ==
Du Fresne was born in Tākaka and grew up in a Danish-French Huguenot settlement in the Manawatū District on the North Island. She trained as a teacher in Christchurch, specialising in music, and taught in primary school and at the Correspondence School.

== Writing ==
Du Fresne was first published in the 1950s. In 1980, she published a collection of short stories Farvel and other stories which received the PEN best first book award. The stories were read on radio under the title Astrid of the Limberlost. The same character from Farvel featured in another book of stories, The Growing of Astric Westergaard, published in 1985.

She wrote three radio plays: The Spring, The Ship and A Little Talk About Our Winter District, which were performed on New Zealand's National Radio. In 1999, du Fresne was writer in residence at Aarhus University in Denmark, also received a fellowship from the Danish Ministry of Culture to travel to Kiel University in Germany.

Du Fresne died in Wellington in 2011 at the age of 81. Her work is described by Read NZ Te Pou Muramura as "among the finest literary examinations of non-British European cultures in New Zealand". Maurice Gee said of her work "beautifully fresh stuff, unlike anything we’d had before. Danes in New Zealand and back home were her true subject, the thing that lit her up. Her writing, especially those early stories, is unique."

== Selected works ==
Du Fresne wrote:

- The Book of Ester, novel (1982), runner up for the New Zealand Book Awards
- The Growing of Astrid Westergaard, short stories (1985), runner up for the New Zealand Book Awards
- Frederique, novel (1987)
- The Bear from the North, stories (1989)
- Motherland, novel (1996)
- The Morning Talk, ahort story
