= Keith Smith (cricketer) =

New Zealand cricketer

Personal information
- Full name: Keith Frederick Henry Smith
- Born: 30 April 1929; Masterton, New Zealand
- Died: 6 June 2016 (aged 87); Wellington, New Zealand
- Batting: Right-handed
- Bowling: Slow left-arm orthodox
- Role: Top-order batsman

Domestic team information
- Years: Team
- 1953/54–1954/55: Wellington
- 1955/56–1960/61: Central Districts
- FC debut: 25 December 1953 Wellington v Central Districts
- Last FC: 28 January 1961 Central Districts v MCC

Career statistics
Competition	First-class
Matches	38
Runs scored	1,719
Batting average	25.65
100s/50s	2/7
Top score	141*
Balls bowled	2,186
Wickets	35
Bowling average	22.37
5 wickets in innings	0
10 wickets in match	0
Best bowling	3/0
Catches/stumpings	15/–
- Source: CricketArchive, 10 November 2016

Keith Frederick Henry Smith (30 April 1929 – 6 June 2016) was a New Zealand cricketer. He played first-class cricket for Central Districts and Wellington between 1953 and 1961.

== Biography ==
Born in Masterton in 1929, Smith was educated at Wellington College. He went on to train as a teacher at Wellington Teachers' College.

A right-hand batsman and slow left-arm orthodox bowler, Smith made his first-class debut for Wellington against Central Districts in the 1953/54 season, scoring 141 not out—his highest first-class score—in the second innings. He went on to make five appearances for Wellington over two seasons, before moving to Hawke's Bay, and playing 33 times for Central Districts between 1955/56 and 1960/61. In his 38 first-class games, Smith scored 1719 runs at an average of 25.65, and took 35 wickets at an average of 22.37.

Smith served as a Wellington selector between 1969 and 1975, and in 1978 he became a vice-president of the Wellington Cricket Association.

He died in Wellington on 6 June 2016.
