= Bill Clark (rugby union) =

NZ international rugby union player

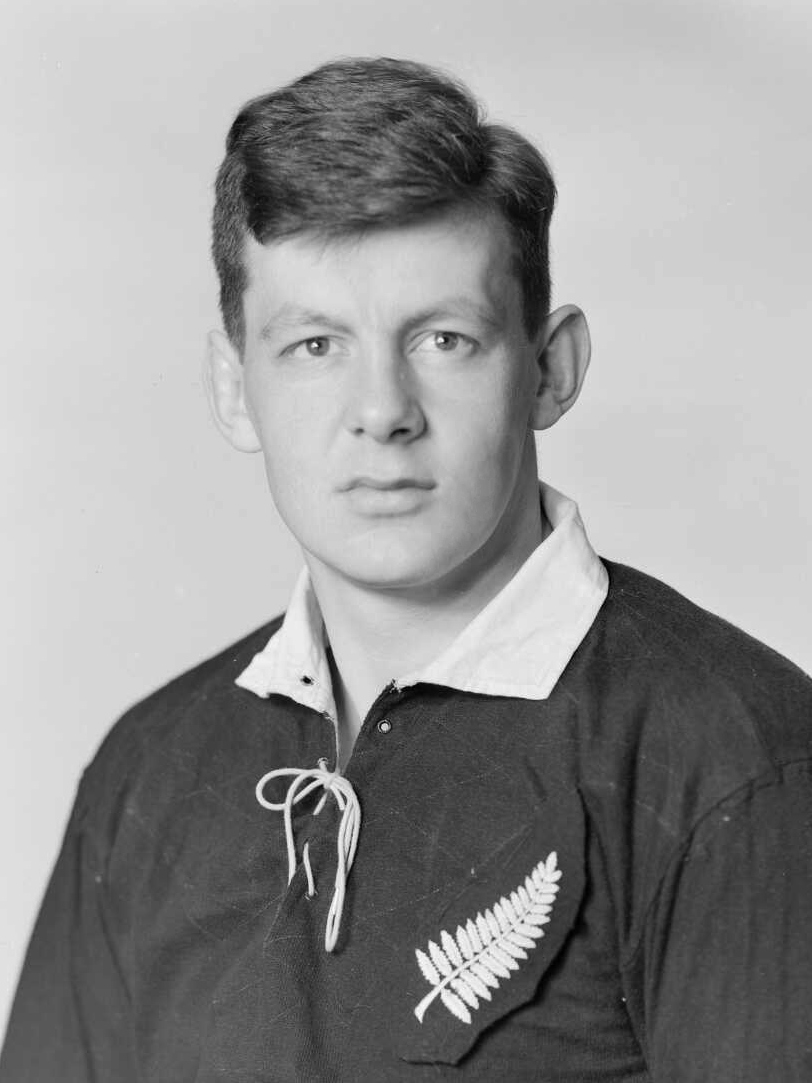
- Clark in 1953
- Born: William Henry Clark; 16 November 1929 Motueka, New Zealand
- Died: 3 June 2010 (aged 80) Nelson, New Zealand
- Height: 1.86 m (6 ft 1 in)
- Weight: 82 kg (181 lb)
- School: Nelson College
- University: Victoria University of Wellington

Rugby union career
- Position: Flanker
Amateur team(s)
Years	Team	Apps	(Points)
- Victoria University
Provincial / State sides
Years	Team	Apps	(Points)
1950–58	Wellington		
International career
Years	Team	Apps	(Points)
1953–56	New Zealand	9	(9)

William Henry Clark (16 November 1929 – 3 June 2010) was a New Zealand rugby union player. A flanker, Clark represented Wellington at a provincial level, and was a member of the New Zealand national side, the All Blacks, from 1953 to 1956. He played 24 matches for the All Blacks including nine internationals.

Clark attended Nelson College from 1943 to 1948. He died in Nelson on 3 June 2010, aged 80.
