= Waimate North =

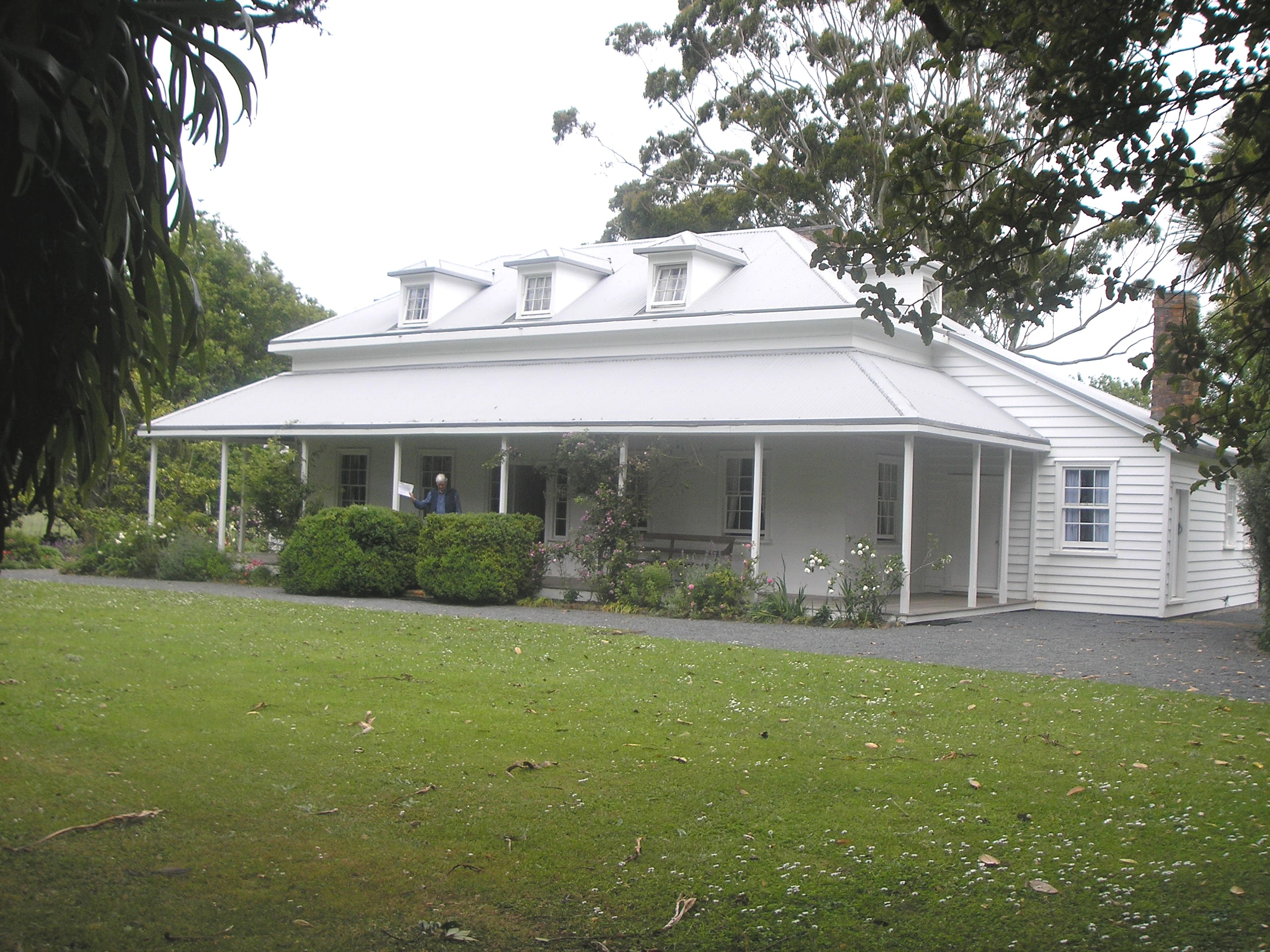
- Te Waimate Mission House
- Interactive map of Waimate North
- Coordinates: 35°18′52″S 173°52′55″E
- Country: New Zealand
- Region: Northland Region
- District: Far North District
- Ward: Kaikohe/Hokianga
- Community: Kaikohe-Hokianga
- Subdivision: Kaikohe
- Electorates: Northland; Te Tai Tokerau

Government
  - Territorial Authority: Far North District Council
  - Regional council: Northland Regional Council
  - Mayor of Far North: Moko Tepania
  - Northland MP: Grant McCallum
  - Te Tai Tokerau MP: Mariameno Kapa-Kingi

Waimate North is a small settlement in Northland, New Zealand. It is situated between Kerikeri and Lake Ōmāpere, west of the Bay of Islands.

It was one of the earliest centres of European settlement and features the second-oldest surviving European building in New Zealand, at Te Waimate Mission.

== History ==
=== Pre-European history ===
Okuratope Pā was situated here and was the home to chief Te Hotete (father of Hongi Hika) of the Ngai Tawake hapū in the late 18th-early 19th centuries. A major disturbance took place here in 1800, when an attacking Ngare Raumati war party from Rāwhiti murdered and ate chief Te Maoi's wife, Te Auparo as well as their daughter, Te Karehu. This led to revenge attacks, which lasted over two decades; and resulted in the comprehensive defeat of the Ngare Raumati and the conquest of their lands by Ngāpuhi (including Te Maoi and Te Auparo's three chiefly sons; Te Wharerahi, Rewa, and Moka Te Kainga-mataa.

=== European settlement ===
Te Waimate Mission was the fourth mission station established in New Zealand, and the first settlement inland from the Bay of Islands. The members of the Church Missionary Society (CMS) appointed to establish the mission were the Rev. William Yate and lay members Richard Davis, George Clarke and James Hamlin.

The first European wedding in New Zealand was conducted on 11 October 1831 at the St. John the Baptist Church, when William Gilbert Puckey (26), son of a Missionary carpenter, William Puckey, married Matilda Elizabeth Davis (17), second daughter of the Missionary Rev. Richard Davis.

During the Flagstaff War (1845-1846) casualties of the Battle of Ōhaeawai were buried in the church yard of Church of St John the Baptist, including Captain Grant of the 58th Regiment and Lieutenant George Phillpotts of HMS Hazard. The mission station was used as the headquarters for the British army, after which the mission lost support among Māori. The mission station gradually fell into disrepair and the buildings were subsequently put up for sale. Today the only remnant on the site is the house originally occupied by George Clarke, which is preserved by Heritage New Zealand as a museum.

=== Modern history ===
The existing St. John the Baptist Church at Waimate North was built in 1870 and 1871.

Waimate North Christian School closed in 2005.

=== Marae ===
The local Tauwhara Marae and Te Rangiawhiowhio meeting house is a traditional meeting ground for the Ngāpuhi hapū of Ngāi Tāwake, Ngāti Hineira, Ngāti Rēhia, Ngāti Tawake ki te Tuawhenua and Whānautara.

In October 2020, the Government committed $500,000 from the Provincial Growth Fund to upgrade the marae, creating 29 jobs.

== Demographics ==
Waimate North is in two SA1 statistical areas which cover 13.85 km^{2} (5.35 sq mi) and includes an area north of Ōhaeawai and south of the Waitangi River. The SA1 areas are part of the larger Ōhaeawai-Waimate North statistical area.

Historical population
Year	Pop.	±% p.a.
2006	171	—
2013	207	+2.77%
2018	285	+6.60%
2023	342	+3.71%
The 2006 population is for a smaller area of 11.20 km^{2} Source:

The SA1 areas had a population of 342 in the 2023 New Zealand census, an increase of 57 people (20.0%) since the 2018 census, and an increase of 135 people (65.2%) since the 2013 census. There were 174 males and 171 females in 114 dwellings. 1.8% of people identified as LGBTIQ+. There were 45 people (13.2%) aged under 15 years, 54 (15.8%) aged 15 to 29, 165 (48.2%) aged 30 to 64, and 78 (22.8%) aged 65 or older.

People could identify as more than one ethnicity. The results were 77.2% European (Pākehā), 36.0% Māori, 2.6% Pasifika, 4.4% Asian, and 1.8% other, which includes people giving their ethnicity as "New Zealander". English was spoken by 99.1%, Māori language by 13.2%, and other languages by 7.0%. The percentage of people born overseas was 19.3, compared with 28.8% nationally.

Religious affiliations were 26.3% Christian, 2.6% Māori religious beliefs, 1.8% New Age, and 0.9% other religions. People who answered that they had no religion were 61.4%, and 6.1% of people did not answer the census question.

Of those at least 15 years old, 39 (13.1%) people had a bachelor's or higher degree, 165 (55.6%) had a post-high school certificate or diploma, and 81 (27.3%) people exclusively held high school qualifications. 27 people (9.1%) earned over $100,000 compared to 12.1% nationally. The employment status of those at least 15 was that 147 (49.5%) people were employed full-time, and 45 (15.2%) were part-time.
