= Ray Hitchcock (cricketer) =

New Zealand cricketer (1929–2019)

Personal information
- Full name: Raymond Edward Hitchcock
- Born: 28 November 1929; Christchurch, New Zealand
- Died: 8 September 2019 (aged 89); Solihull, England
- Batting: Left-handed
- Bowling: Leg-break and googly

Domestic team information
- Years: Team
- 1947–48: Canterbury
- 1949 to 1964: Warwickshire

Career statistics
Competition	First-class	List A
Matches	323	5
Runs scored	12473	91
Batting average	27.84	30.33
100s/50s	13/65	0/0
Top score	153*	47*
Balls bowled	12561	155
Wickets	196	5
Bowling average	29.82	13.80
5 wickets in innings	7	–
10 wickets in match	1	n/a
Best bowling	7/76	2/15
Catches/stumpings	116/0	0/0
- Source: CricketArchive, 25 April 2019

Raymond Edward Hitchcock (28 November 1929 – 8 September 2019) was a New Zealand first-class cricketer who played in England for Warwickshire.

Hitchcock was a left-handed batsman who also bowled right-arm leg-spin. He played two games in New Zealand for Canterbury in 1947–48 before moving to England. Between 1949 and 1964 he scored 12,269 runs for Warwickshire and took 182 wickets. He made his highest score against Derbyshire in 1962 when he went to the wicket with Warwickshire at 50 for 4 and scored 153 not out in just under two and a half hours out of a team total of 280. His best bowling figures came in the match against Scotland in 1959 when he took 7 for 76 and 3 for 27.
