= George Clarke (New Zealand pioneer) =

Australian-born New Zealand pioneer and educationist

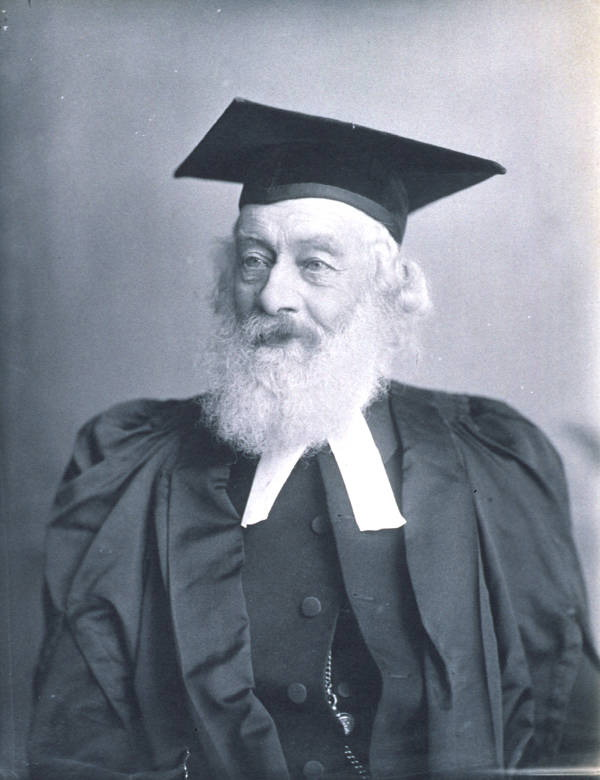
From the frontispiece of Notes on Early Life in New Zealand (1903), by George Clarke, which mentions Treaty of Waitangi

George Clarke (29 June 1823 – 10 March 1913) was an Australian-born New Zealand colonial official, pioneer, Congregational minister and educationist.

== Early life ==
George Clarke was born in Parramatta, New South Wales, on 29 June 1823. His father was the Revd George Clarke, an early missionary to New Zealand with the Church Missionary Society. The family moved to New Zealand in 1822 where his father worked at the Waimate mission, teaching the Māori students.

In 1832 Clarke was sent to Hobart, Australia to study at R.W. Giblin's school, and later returned to New Zealand in 1837 to study under the Reverend William Williams. He accompanied Williams to Poverty Bay in 1839 where he acquired knowledge of the Māori language and Māori society, which proved valuable in his later career

== New Zealand Career ==
In 1841 Clarke was appointed a clerk of the Zealand civil service in the Native Department as Sub-Protector of Aborigines, acting as interpreter and negotiator with the Māori. In February 1842 he was translator at the trial of Wiremu Kingi Maketu, who was the first Māori condemned to death for murder.

At the age of 19, Clarke accompanied Commissioner William Spain during the inquiry into land claims of the New Zealand Company. The inquiry investigated the validity of the purchases of Māori land by the New Zealand Company prior to the signing of the Treaty of Waitangi. He was strongly criticised by the company's representatives as taking the Māori side too often in the disputes. Eventually the claims of the company were reduced. New Plymouth and Manawatu were shown to have been purchased correctly but in most other cases the New Zealand Company had to pay further sums to Māori as compensation.

In 1844 Clarke was sent to Otago to assist with the purchasing of a large block of land, securing some 400,000 acres, whilst also working to preserve the Māori village cultivations and burial grounds. Clarke wrote the original Māori deed and English translation, later taking pride that no disputes arose over the transaction.

During the first eight months of 1845 when the Flagstaff War (Heke's War) broke out between the British and Māori, Clarke was, for much of the time, the only government representative in the district. When Governor Grey arrived in November, he attached Clarke to his personal staff, and peace was eventually declared. Eventually, Clarke resigned in 1846, no longer able to reconcile his conscience with the some the actions of the government.

== Ministry and Australian career ==
Wishing to follow a life in the Ministry, Clarke left New Zealand for Hobart in 1847 and then sailed onto London, where he commenced training. He was ordained in the Congregational church in 1851, returning to Hobart as minister of the Collins Street Church and later Davey Street Church for the next fifty years.

Clarke was for some years a member and later president (1880 to 1881) of the Tasmanian Council of Education. He was a founder of the University of Tasmania, serving as its first vice-chancellor from 1890 to 1898, and then as chancellor from 1898 to 1907. He was also promoter of the Hobart Debating and Literary Association and member of the Royal Society of Tasmania.

Clare gave up his Church work in 1904 and died on at Hobart on 10 March 1913.

== Publications ==
- Notes on Early Life in New Zealand (1903)
- Short Liturgies for Congregational Worship
