= George Allen (architect) =

Architect, surveyor, teacher, tourist guide, artist (1837–1929)

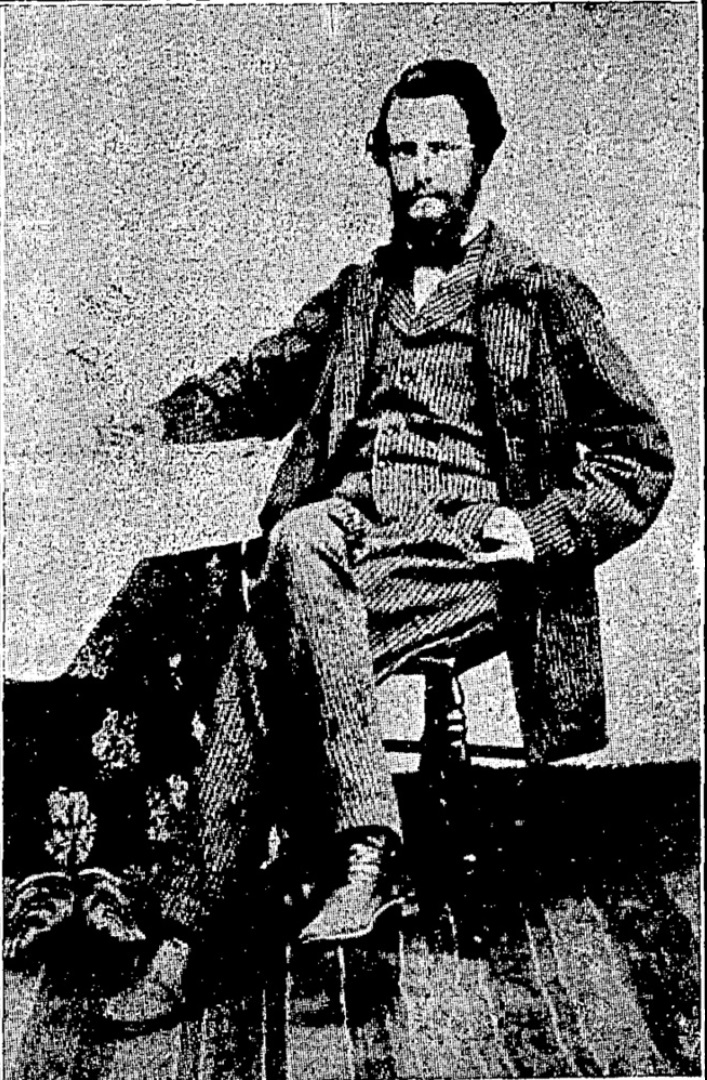
George Frederic Allen, 1903

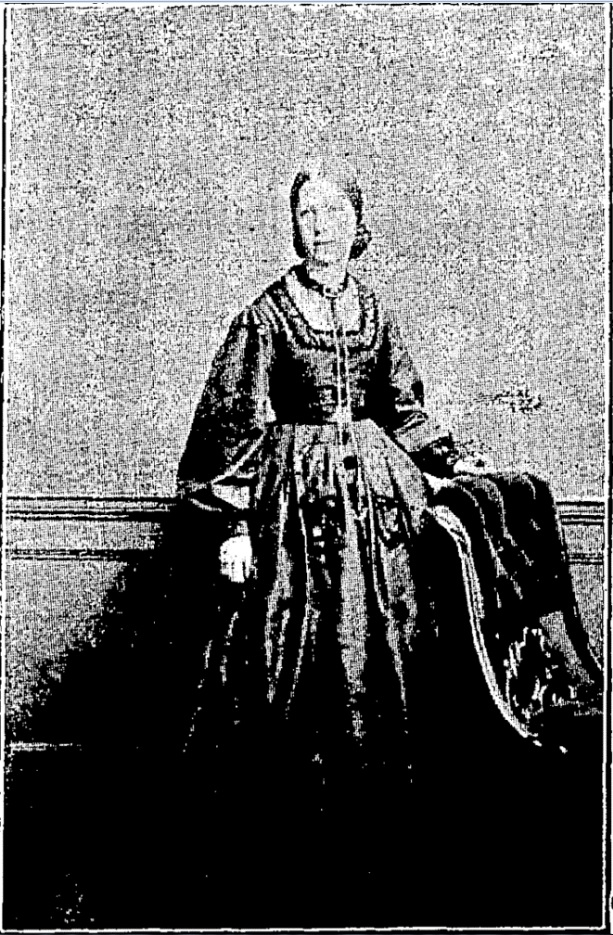
Allans wife Caroline Frances Allen, 1903

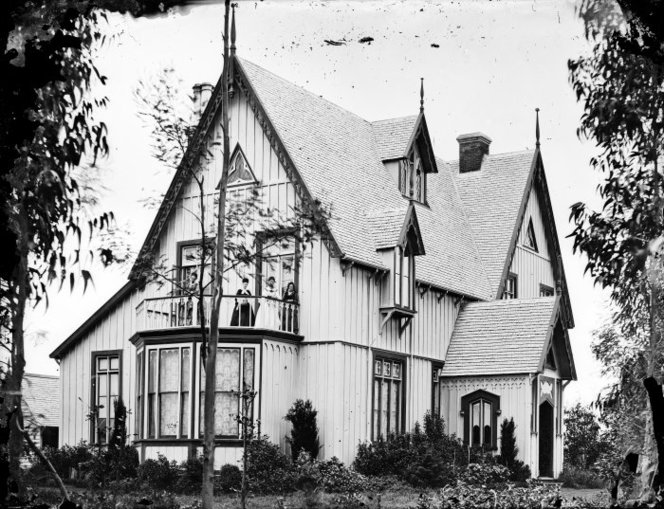
Trenton House, Oneida ca. 1870

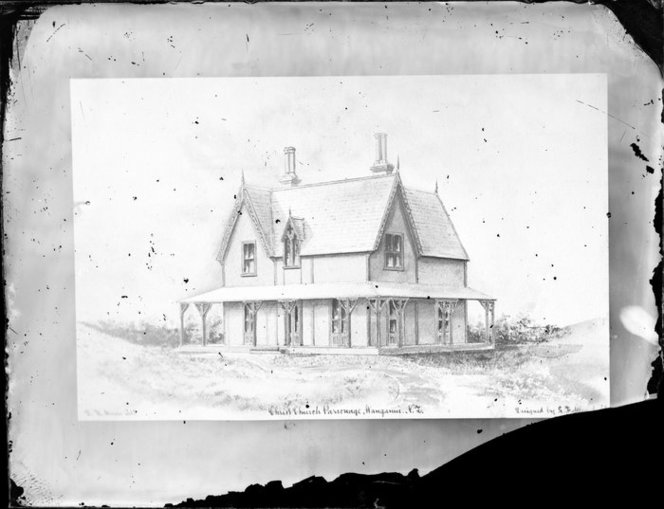
Christ Church Parsonage, Wanganui

George Frederic Allen (15 February 1837 – 28 February 1929) was a New Zealand architect, surveyor, teacher and tourist guide. He was born in London, England on 15 February 1837.
