= Sarah Cryer =

- Born: 14 February 1848; Wroughton, Wiltshire, England
- Died: 30 August 1929 (aged 81)
- Occupations: Farmer, community worker, benefactor
- Known for: Farming and community philanthropy in New Zealand

Sarah Cryer (14 February 1848 – 30 August 1929) was a New Zealand farmer, community worker and benefactor. She was born in Wroughton, Wiltshire, England, on 14 February 1848.
