= George Clarke (judge) =

New Zealand politician (1798–1875)

- Born: 27 January 1798; Wymondham, Norfolk, England
- Died: 29 July 1875 (aged 77); Waimate North, New Zealand
- Occupation: Missionary
- Spouse: Martha Elizabeth Blomfield

George Clarke (27 January 1798 – 29 July 1875) was a New Zealand missionary, teacher, public servant, politician and judge. He was born in Wymondham, Norfolk, England on 27 January 1798. He joined the Church Missionary Society (CMS). Clarke married Martha Elizabeth Blomfield (born 11 December 1802 in Wymondham). the second daughter of Ezekiel Blomfield, a Congregational minister.

Clarke, his wife Martha and family (including their son George Clarke Jr.) sailed from Sydney on La Coquille, arriving in the Bay of Islands on 4 April 1824. George was trained as a blacksmith and was appointed to the CMS mission in Kerikeri. Then he worked at Te Waimate mission teaching Māori students. From 1831 to 1839, Clarke and Richard Davis managed the farm at Waimate North at which Māori students learnt farming skills. He was appointed as secretary of the CMS in New Zealand.

His son Edward Blomfield Clarke was the first child baptised in St. John the Baptist Church at Te Waimate Mission (10 July 1831). Edward Blomfield Clarke later took holy orders and was appointed to St. John the Baptist Church (1863-1884) and was also appointed the Archdeacon of Te Waimate (1870-1901).

In 1840, Clarke was made Chief Protector of the Māori by the recently appointed lieutenant-governor, Captain Hobson. The seat of government was transferred to Auckland, and there Clarke bought a large block of land from the Māori for the government.

Governor George Grey abolished the protectorate in 1846. Clarke returned to Waimate North, where he became a farmer and resumed his work as secretary of the CMS in New Zealand. However, controversy in relation to land purchases by CMS missionaries resulted in Clarke being dismissed from the CMS in 1849. Clarke was elected to the Auckland Provincial Council at the 1853 New Zealand provincial elections and served from 1853 to 1855. He was appointed a judge of the Native Land Court in 1865. He died at Waimate North on 29 July 1875.
