= William Gough (antiquarian) =

English antiquarian

- Born: 1654? Earl Stoke, Wiltshire
- Died: 1682
- Occupation: Antiquarian

William Gough (1654?–1682) was an English antiquarian.

== Biography ==
Gough was the son of William Gough, incumbent of Earl Stoke, Wiltshire, was born at Earl Stoke about 1654, and became a sojourner of Exeter College, Oxford, in Michaelmas term, 1671; but on Marsh, his tutor, becoming principal of St. Alban Hall in 1673, he removed to that house, and took his B.A. degree, 10 June 1675 (Wood, Fasti Oxon., ed. Bliss, ii. 347). On leaving the university, he went to London, ‘where,’ says Wood, ‘he sided with the whiggish party upon the breaking out of the Popish plot, an. 1678, [and] industriously carried on the cause then driven on’ (Athenæ Oxon., ed. Bliss, iv. 61). He died of smallpox in November 1682, and was buried in the church of St. Dunstan in the West, Fleet Street. He wrote ‘Londinum Triumphans; or, an Historical Account of the grand Influence the Actions of the City of London have had upon the Affairs of the Nation for many Ages past,’ 8vo, London, 1682.
