= Waitaoro =

New Zealand Māori tribal leader (c. 1848–1929)

Waitaoro (c.1848 – 26 March 1929) was a New Zealand tribal leader. Of Māori descent, she identified with the Ngāti Tama iwi. She was born in the Chatham Islands, New Zealand, in about 1848.
