= Jenny King =

New Zealand librarian (1929–2021)

- Born: Jeanette King; 14 February 1929; Auckland, New Zealand
- Died: 10 May 2021 (aged 92)
- Occupation: Librarian

Jeanette King (14 February 1929 – 10 May 2021) was a New Zealand librarian. She was the first university librarian at the University of Waikato, serving in that role for 30 years, from 1964 to 1994.

== Biography ==
Born in the Auckland suburb of Epsom on 14 February 1929, the daughter of stenographer Emily King (née Pudney) and barrister and solicitor Robert King. She was educated at St Cuthbert's College, Auckland, and went on to study science at Auckland University College, graduating Bachelor of Science in 1952. She then began studying medicine at the University of Otago, but returned home when her mother fell ill and subsequently died. She then earned a Bachelor of Arts degree, and studied at the New Zealand Library School, receiving a diploma in 1953.

In the early 1950s, King was engaged to Des Oliver, but the couple did not go on and marry.

King was the librarian at King's College, Auckland, between 1954 and 1957, and also taught chemistry there. In 1959, she was appointed at head of lending services at the University of Auckland library, and in 1964 she moved to the University of Waikato as its first university librarian. During her 30-year tenure, the library's collection expanded from a few hundred to over 700,000 volumes, with a purpose-built library opened in 1977. King retired from Waikato in 1994, and the following year the university conferred her with an honorary doctorate.

King died on 10 May 2021.
