= Anna Maria Williams =

New Zealand teacher and school principal

Anna Maria Williams (25 January 1839 – 5 May 1929) was a New Zealand teacher and school principal. She was born in Waimate North, Northland, New Zealand, in 1839.
