= Stuart Jones (cricketer) =

New Zealand cricketer

Personal information
- Full name: Stuart Thornbury Jones
- Born: 24 January 1929; Naseby, Central Otago, New Zealand
- Died: 20 July 2015 (aged 86); Christchurch, Canterbury, New Zealand
- Batting: Right-handed
- Bowling: Right-arm fast-medium

Domestic team information
- Years: Team
- 1953/54: Otago
- Only FC: 5 February 1954 Otago v Canterbury

Career statistics
Competition	First-class
Matches	1
Runs scored	8
Batting average	4.00
100s/50s	0/0
Top score	6
Balls bowled	90
Wickets	2
Bowling average	18.00
5 wickets in innings	0
10 wickets in match	0
Best bowling	2/20
Catches/stumpings	0/–
- Source: CricketArchive, 19 October 2021

Stuart Thornbury Jones (Note: Jones' name is spelled Stewart by both CricInfo and Andrew McCarron. It is spelled Stuart on his burial records and by CricketArxhive.) (24 January 1929 – 20 July 2015) was a New Zealand cricketer. He played one first-class match for Otago during the 1953–54 season.

Jones was born at Naseby in Central Otago in 1929 and was educated at Kings High School in Dunedin. He played his only top-level representative match in February 1954, scoring eight runs and taking two wickets in a Plunket Shield fixture against Canterbury at Carisbrook in Dunedin. Although he did not return to the Otago first-class side, he did play two fixtures in 1956–57 for the side, including the annual fixture against Southland.

Jones retired to Christchurch where he died in July 2015 at the age of 86. His ashes were buried at Andersons Bay Cemetery in Dunedin alongside his wife who had died in 1962 at the age of 27. The couple had two sons.
