= Niniwa Heremaia =

Niniwa Heremaia or Niniwa-i-te-rangi (6 April 1854 – 23 March 1929) was a Māori leader in New Zealand. She was from the Ngāti Hikawera hapū of Ngāti Kahungunu.

In 1898, during the New Zealand Parliament's Native Affairs Committee inquiry into Māori land legislation, she was the only woman to give evidence. She was involved with the formation of several newspapers: The Te Puke ki Hikurangi and Te Tiupiri published in Māori-language and the Maori Record, an English-language paper for Māori advancement.
