= Carl Edvard Johan Dahl =

- Born: 6 August 1856; Kalundborg, Denmark
- Died: 15 August 1929 (aged 73)
- Occupations: Businessman, importer, vice consul, community leader
- Known for: Commercial and consular work in New Zealand

Carl Edvard Johan Dahl (6 August 1856 – 15 August 1929) was a New Zealand businessman, importer, vice consul and community leader. He was born in Kalundborg, Denmark, on 6 August 1856.
