= William Gough (cricketer) =

New Zealand cricketer

Personal information
- Full name: William John Gough
- Born: 20 October 1929; Dunedin, Otago, New Zealand
- Died: 14 August 1978 (aged 48); Dunedin, Otago, New Zealand
- Batting: Right-handed
- Bowling: Right-arm medium

Domestic team information
- Years: Team
- 1953/54: Otago
- Source: CricInfo, 12 May 2016

William Jon Gough (20 October 1929 – 14 August 1978) was a New Zealand cricketer. He played one first-class match for Otago during the 1953–54 season.

Gough was born at Dunedin in 1929 and educated at Otago Boys' High School. He worked as a clerk.
