= Margaret Gardner (mill owner) =

New Zealand domestic servant

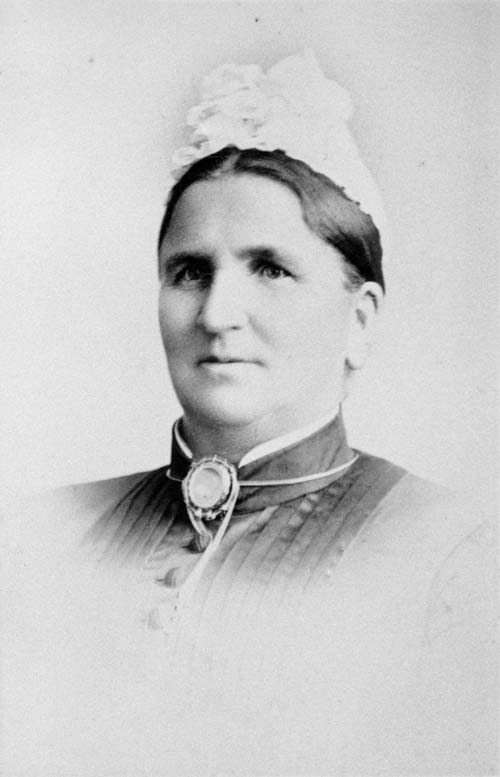
Margaret Gardner, 1880s

Margaret Gardner (8 September 1844 – 19 June 1929) was a New Zealand assisted immigrant, domestic servant, landowner, businesswoman, farmer and flour mill owner.

== Biography ==
She was born in Newmains, Lanarkshire, Scotland in 1844. She emigrated on the Sebastopol to Lyttelton in 1863.

Her husband George built a mill in Canterbury in the 1880s but died in an 1885 accident. After his death, she expanded the mill into a large business, the North Canterbury Co-operative Flourmilling Exporting and Agency Company. She died on 19 June 1929.
