= Egvad Parish, Aabenraa Municipality =

Parish in Aabenraa Municipality, Denmark

Egvad Parish Egvad Sogn
- Parish
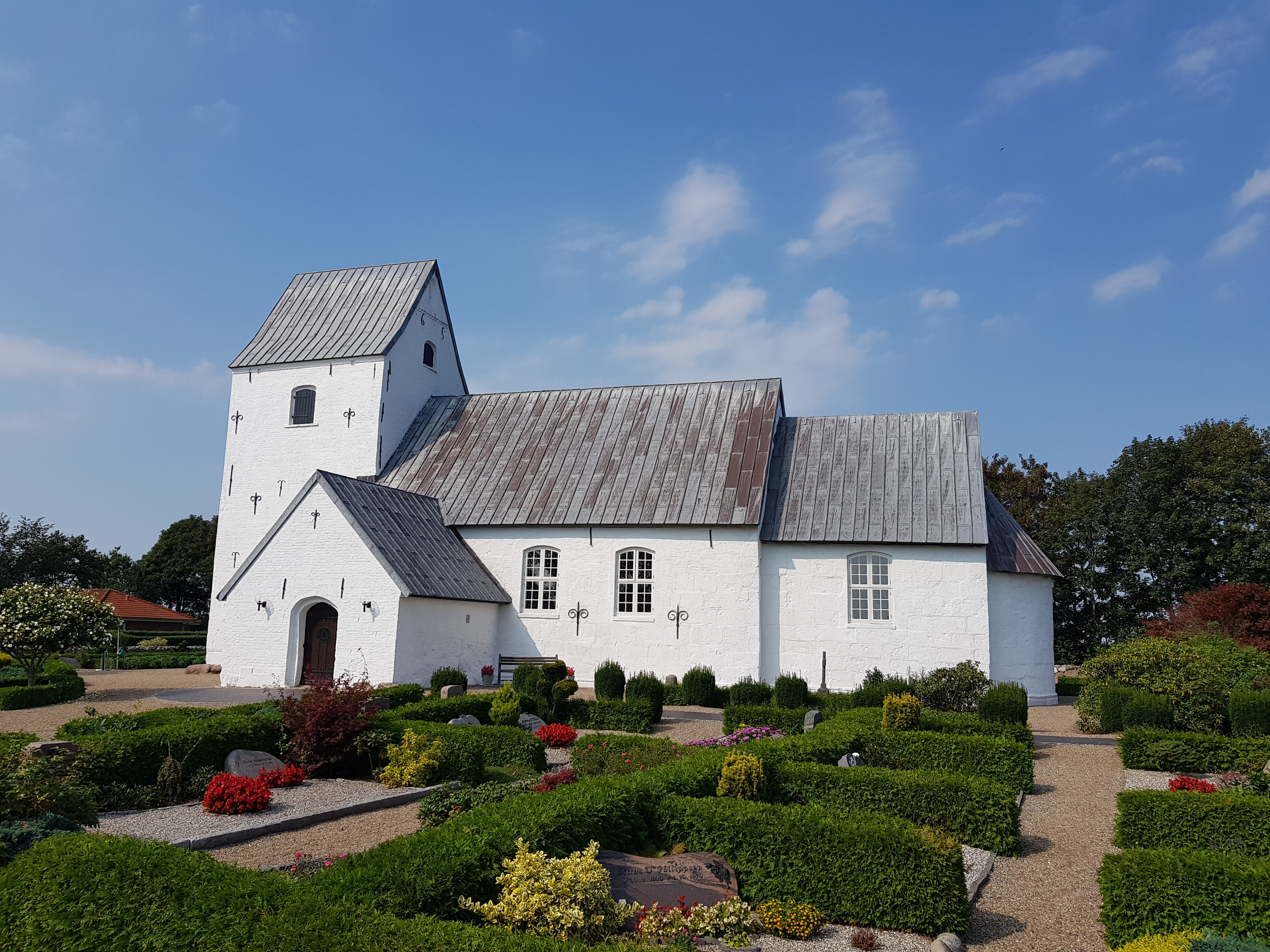
- Egvad Church

- The parish within Aabenraa Municipality
- Coordinates: 55°04′N 9°16′E
- Country: Denmark
- Region: Southern Denmark
- Municipality: Aabenraa Municipality
- Diocese: Haderslev

Population (2025)
  - Total: 400
- Parish number: 9018

Egvad Parish is a parish in the Diocese of Haderslev in Aabenraa Municipality, Denmark.
