= 2021 in New Zealand =

- Decades: 2000s; 2010s; 2020s
- See also: History of New Zealand; List of years in New Zealand; Timeline of New Zealand history

The following lists events that happened during 2021 in New Zealand.

== Incumbents ==
=== Regal and vice-regal ===
- Head of State – Elizabeth II
- Governor-General – Patsy Reddy until 28 September, and then Cindy Kiro from 21 October
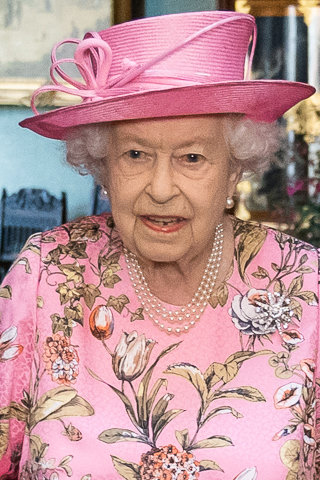
Elizabeth II

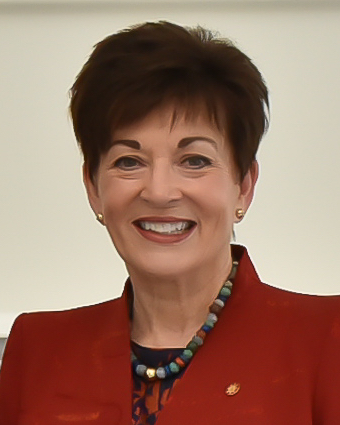
Patsy Reddy

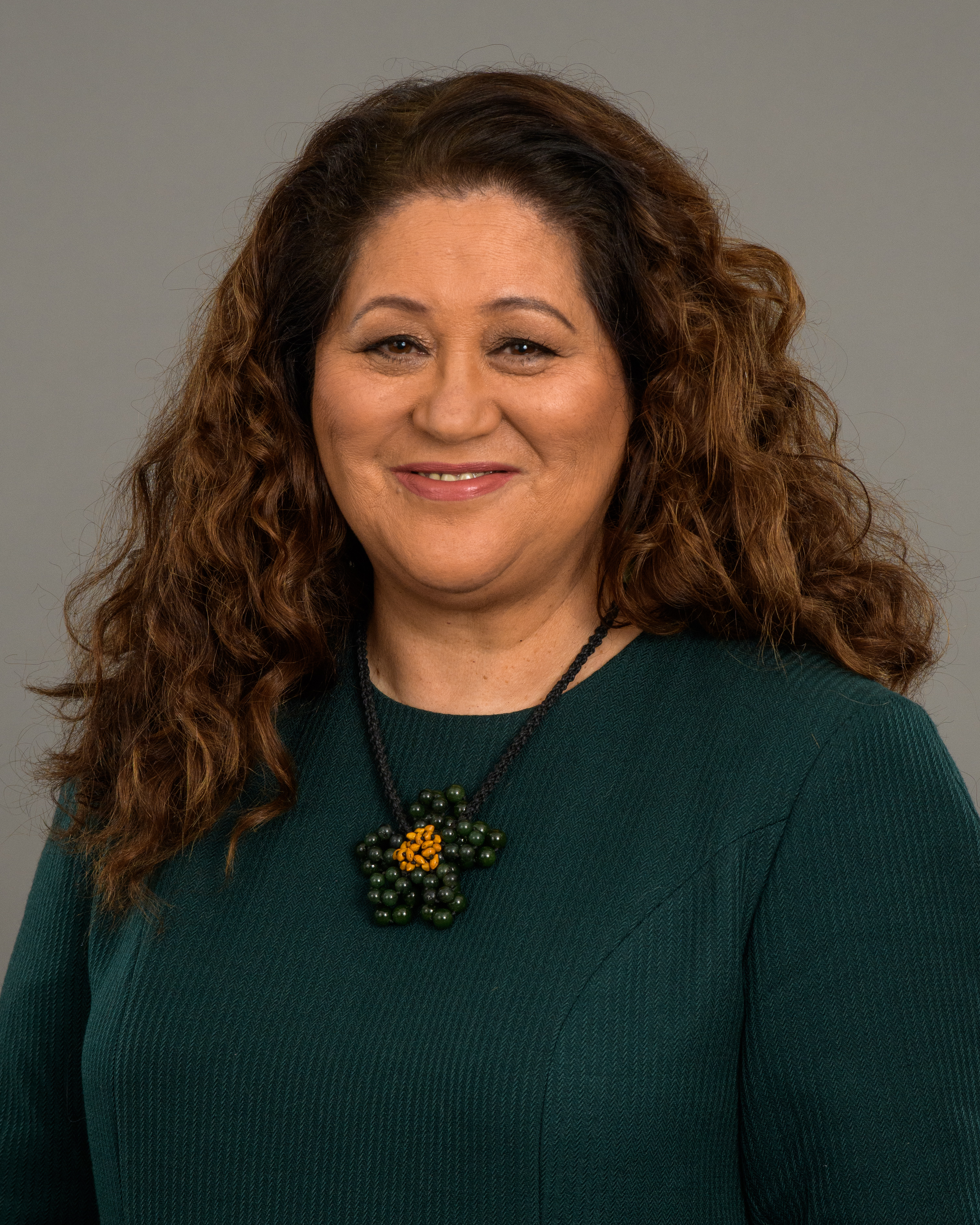
Cindy Kiro

=== Government ===
Legislature term: 53rd New Zealand Parliament

The Sixth Labour Government, elected in 2020, continues.

- Speaker of the House – Trevor Mallard
- Prime Minister – Jacinda Ardern
- Deputy Prime Minister – Grant Robertson
- Leader of the House – Chris Hipkins
- Minister of Finance – Grant Robertson
- Minister of Foreign Affairs – Nanaia Mahuta
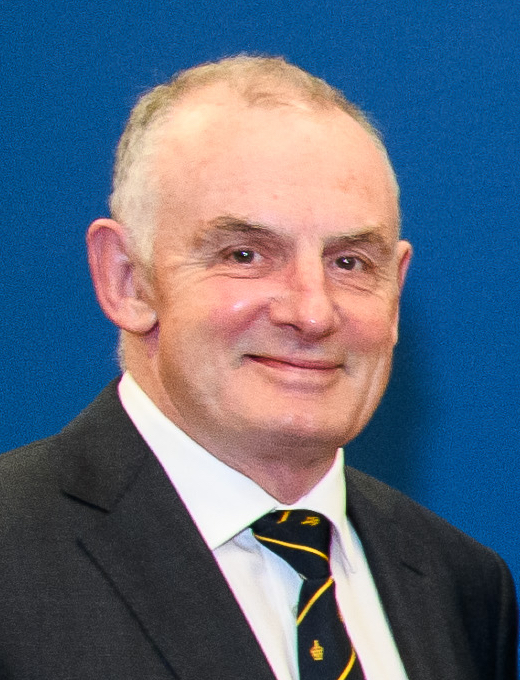
Trevor Mallard

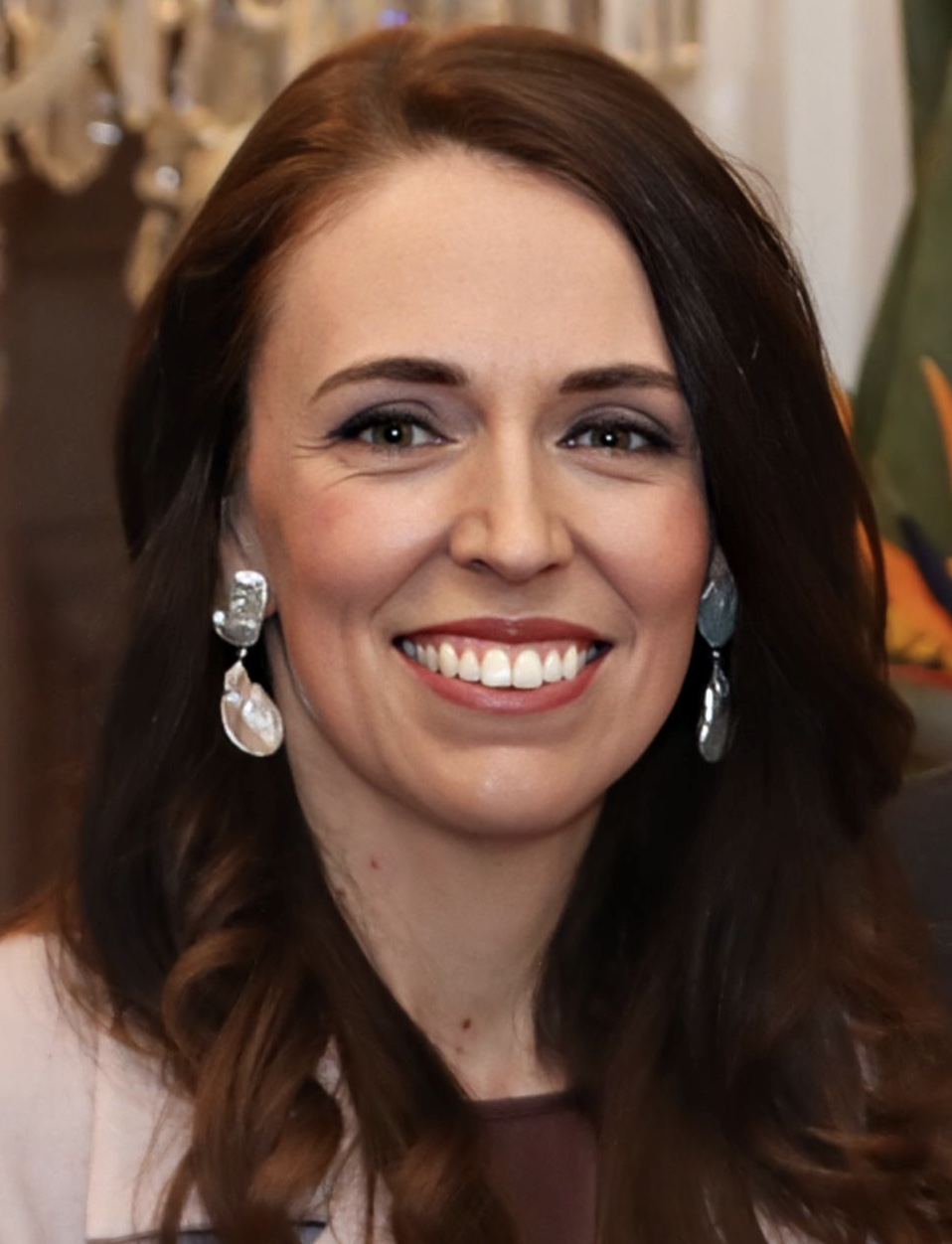
Jacinda Ardern

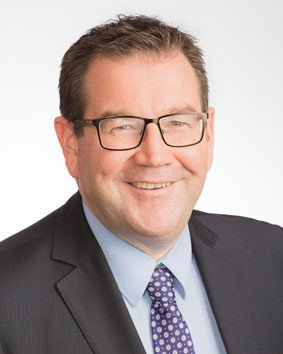
Grant Robertson

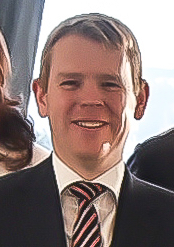
Chris Hipkins

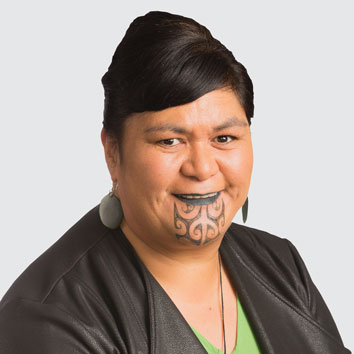
Nanaia Mahuta

=== Other party leaders in parliament ===
- National – Judith Collins until 25 November, then Christopher Luxon from 30 November (leader of the Opposition)
- Green – James Shaw and Marama Davidson
- ACT – David Seymour
- Māori Party – Rawiri Waititi and Debbie Ngarewa-Packer
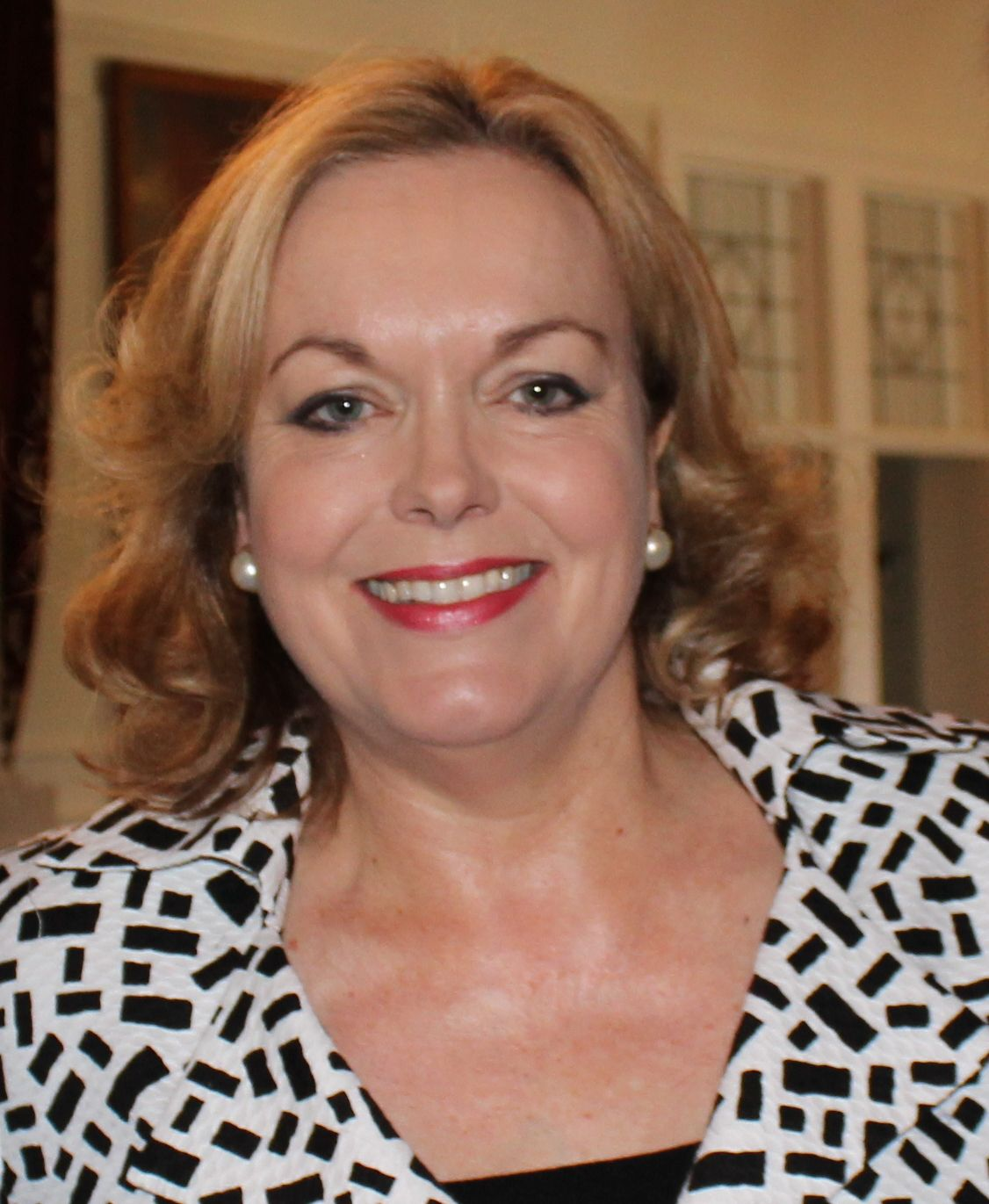
Judith Collins

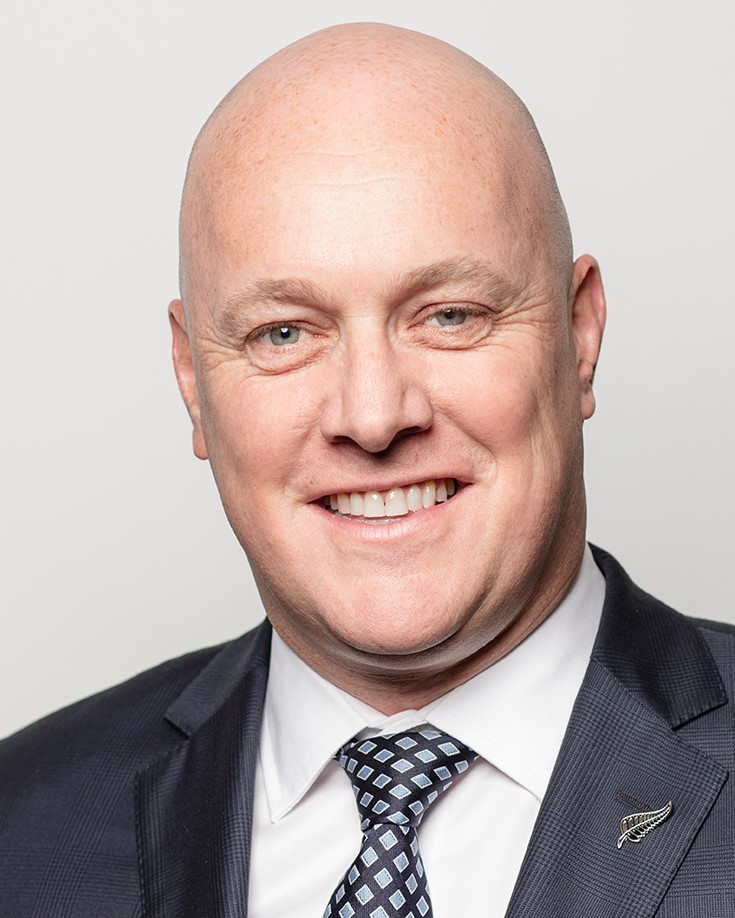
Christopher Luxon

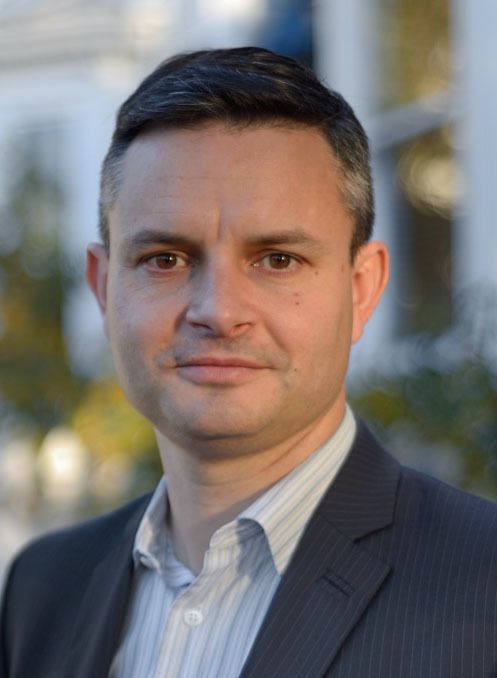
James Shaw

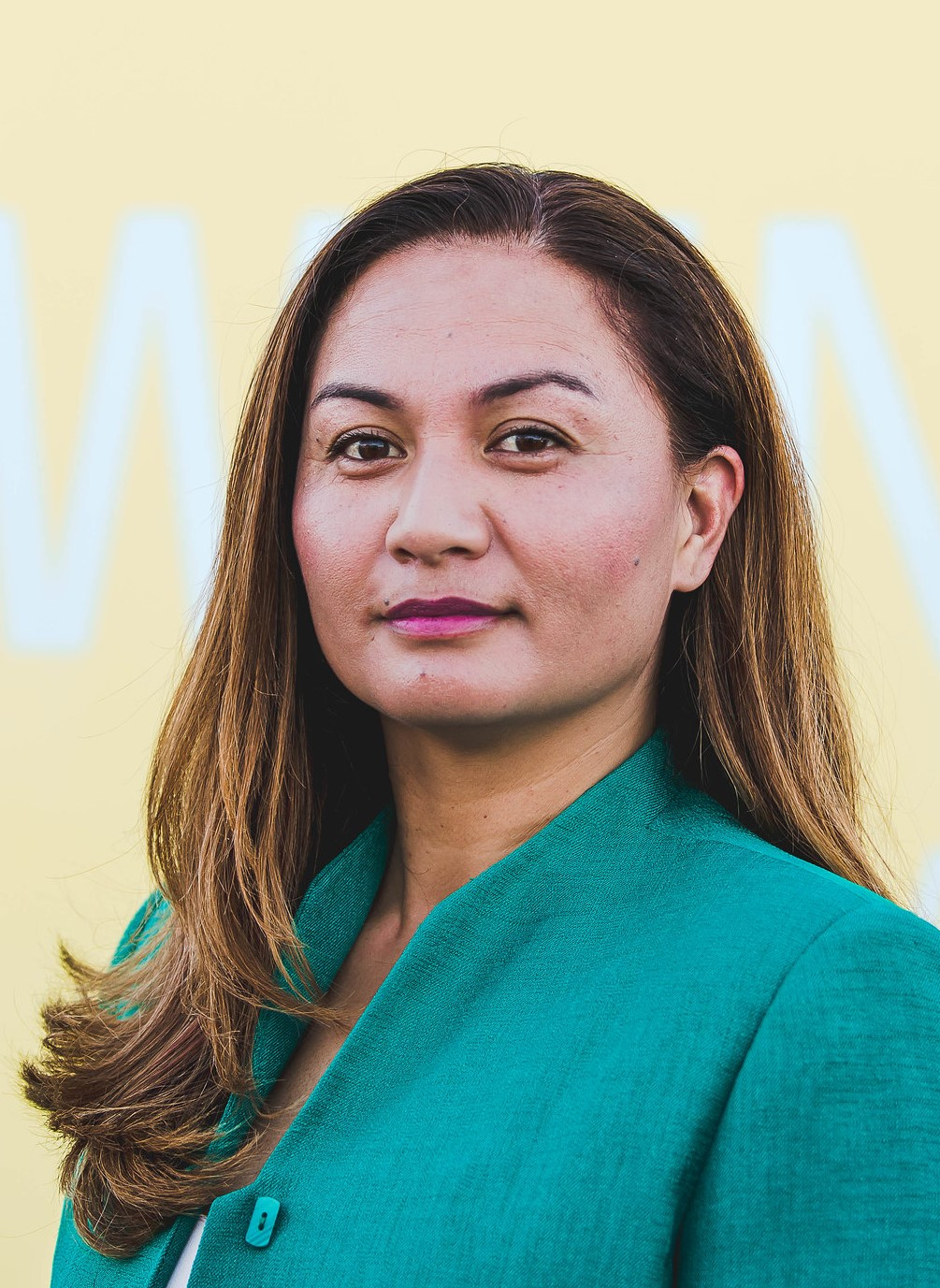
Marama Davidson

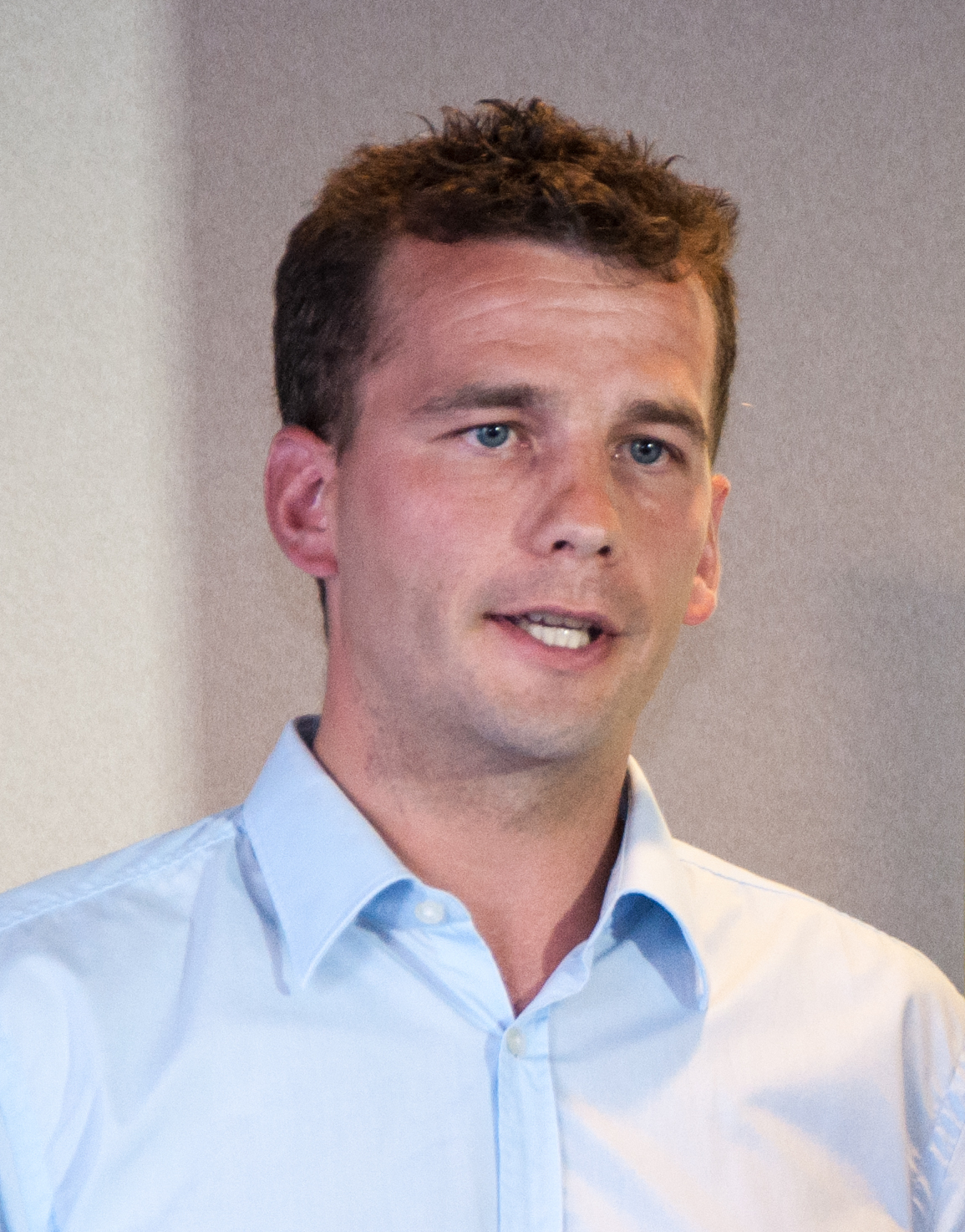
David Seymour

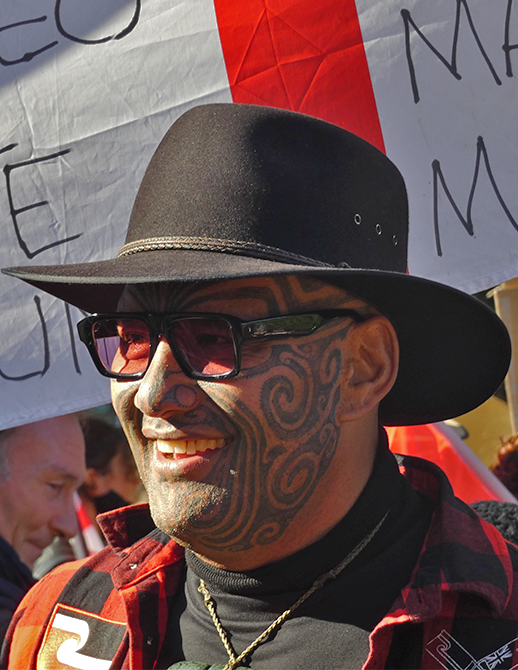
Rawiri Waititi

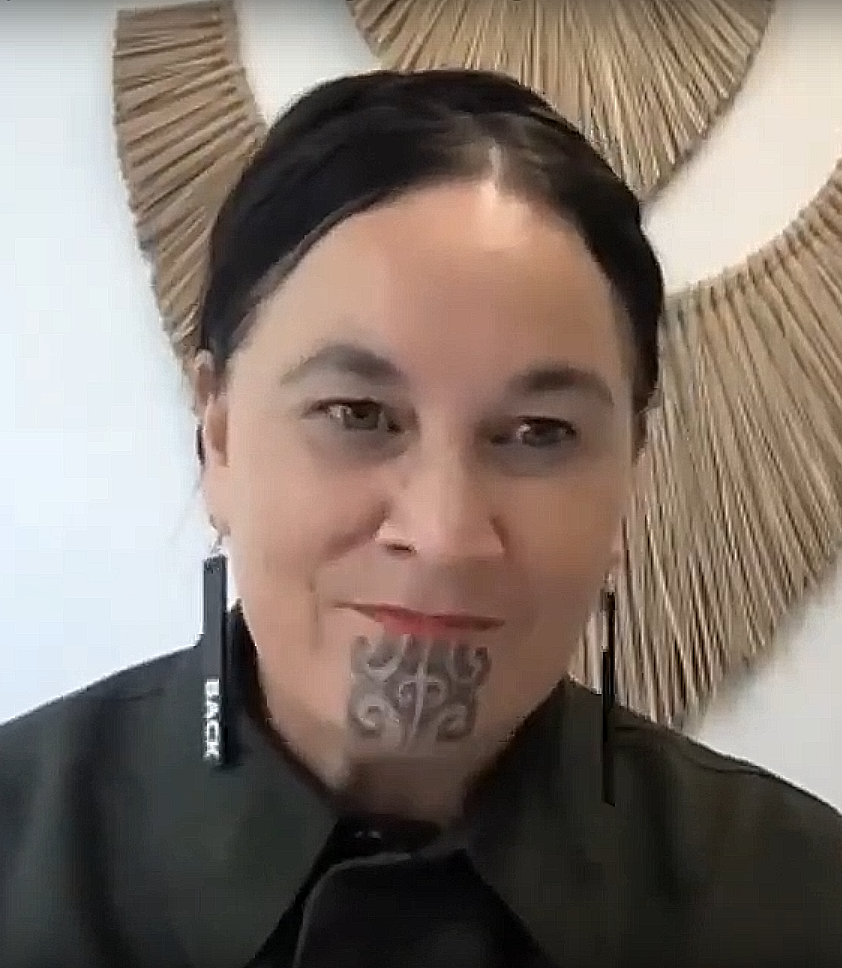
Debbie Ngarewa-Packer

=== Judiciary ===
- Chief Justice – Helen Winkelmann
- President of the Court of Appeal – Stephen Kós
- Chief High Court judge – Susan Thomas
- Chief District Court judge – Heemi Taumaunu
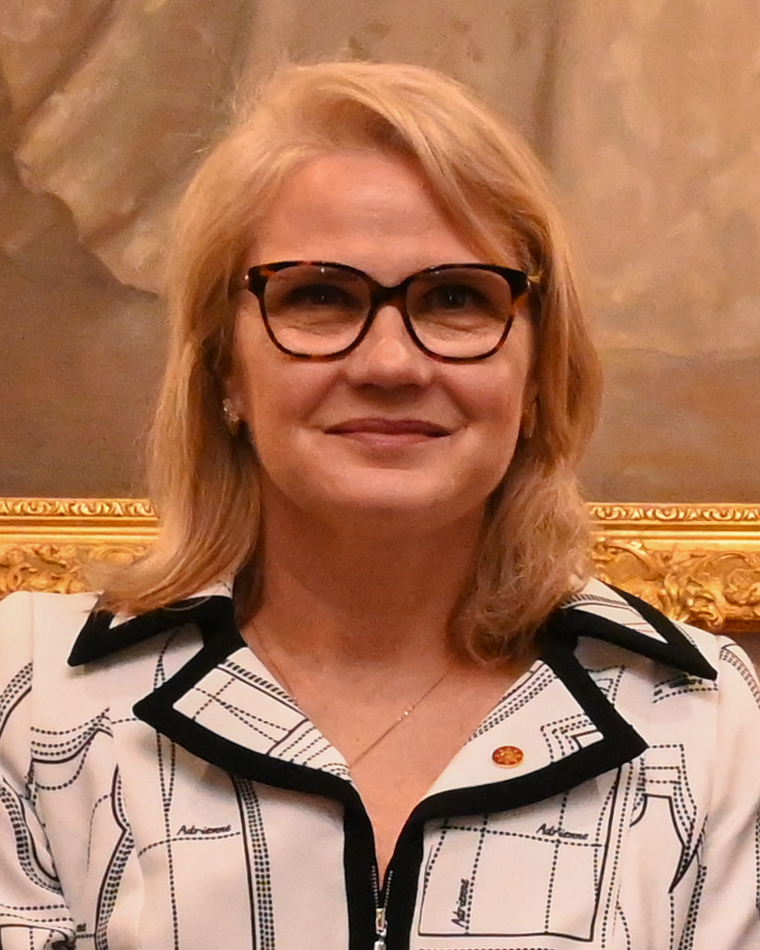
Helen Winkelmann

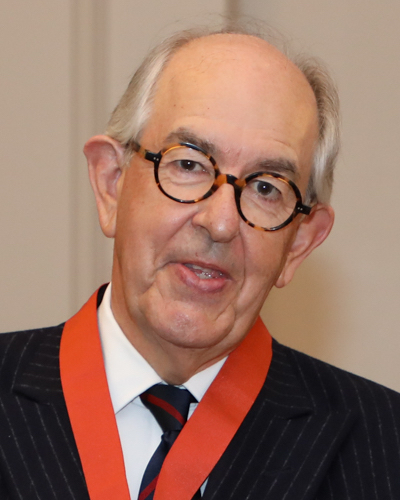
Stephen Kós

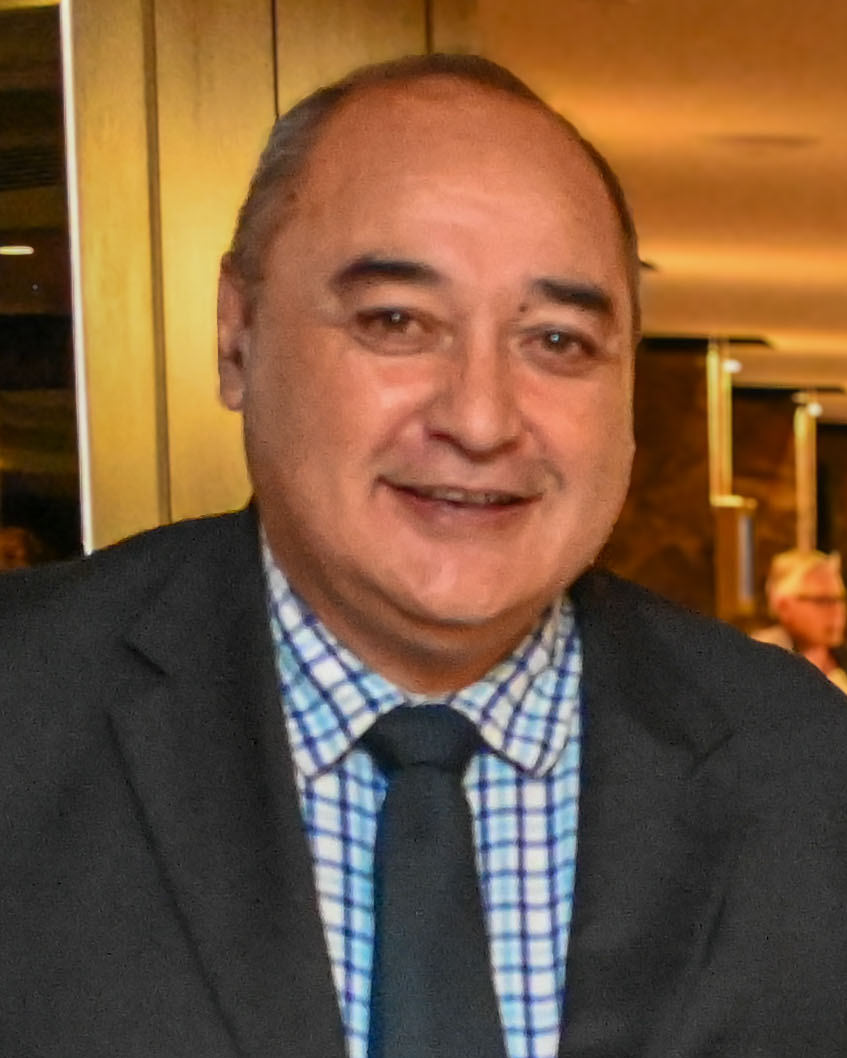
Heemi Taumaunu

=== Main centre leaders ===
- Mayor of Auckland – Phil Goff
- Mayor of Tauranga – Tina Salisbury (acting), then Anne Tolley (as chair of commissioners) from 9 February
- Mayor of Hamilton – Paula Southgate
- Mayor of Wellington – Andy Foster
- Mayor of Christchurch – Lianne Dalziel
- Mayor of Dunedin – Aaron Hawkins
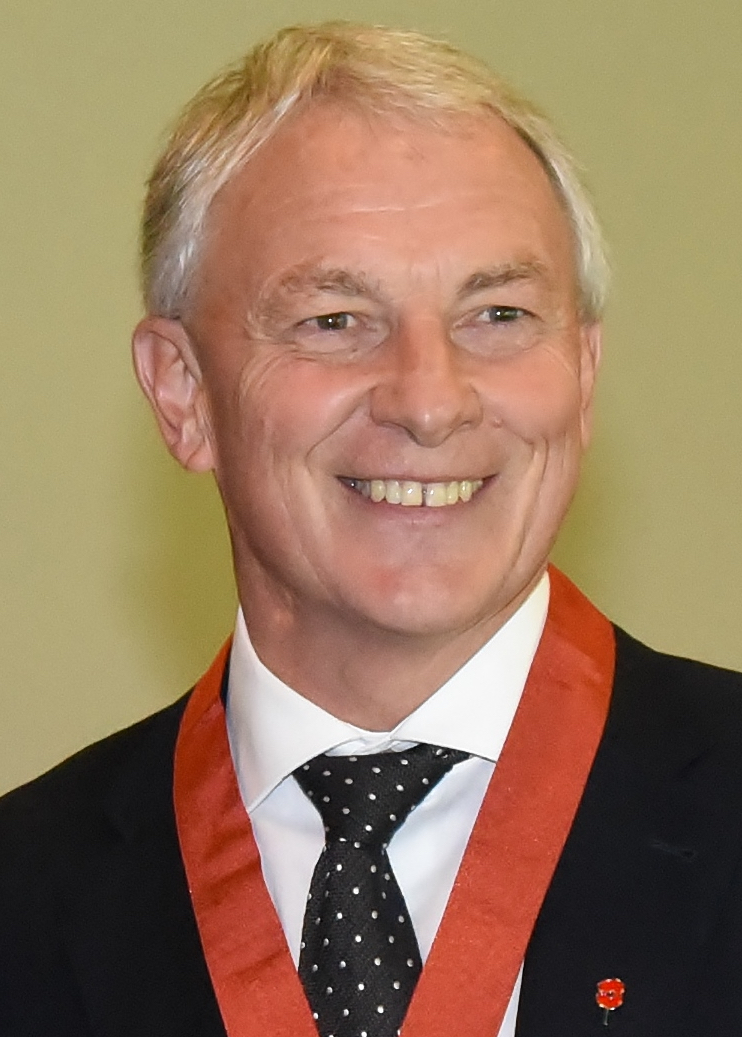
Phil Goff

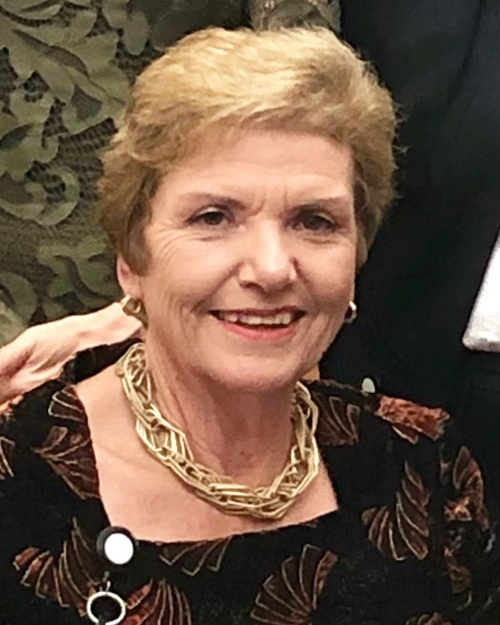
Anne Tolley

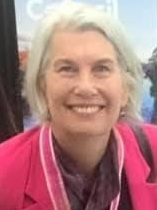
Paula Southgate

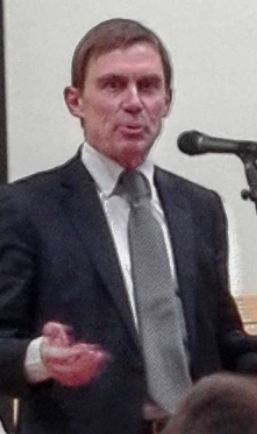
Andy Foster

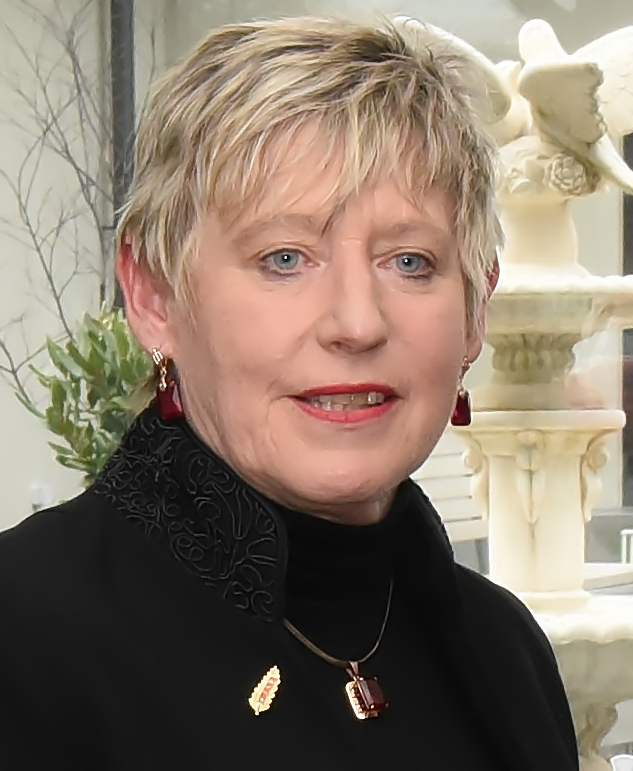
Lianne Dalziell

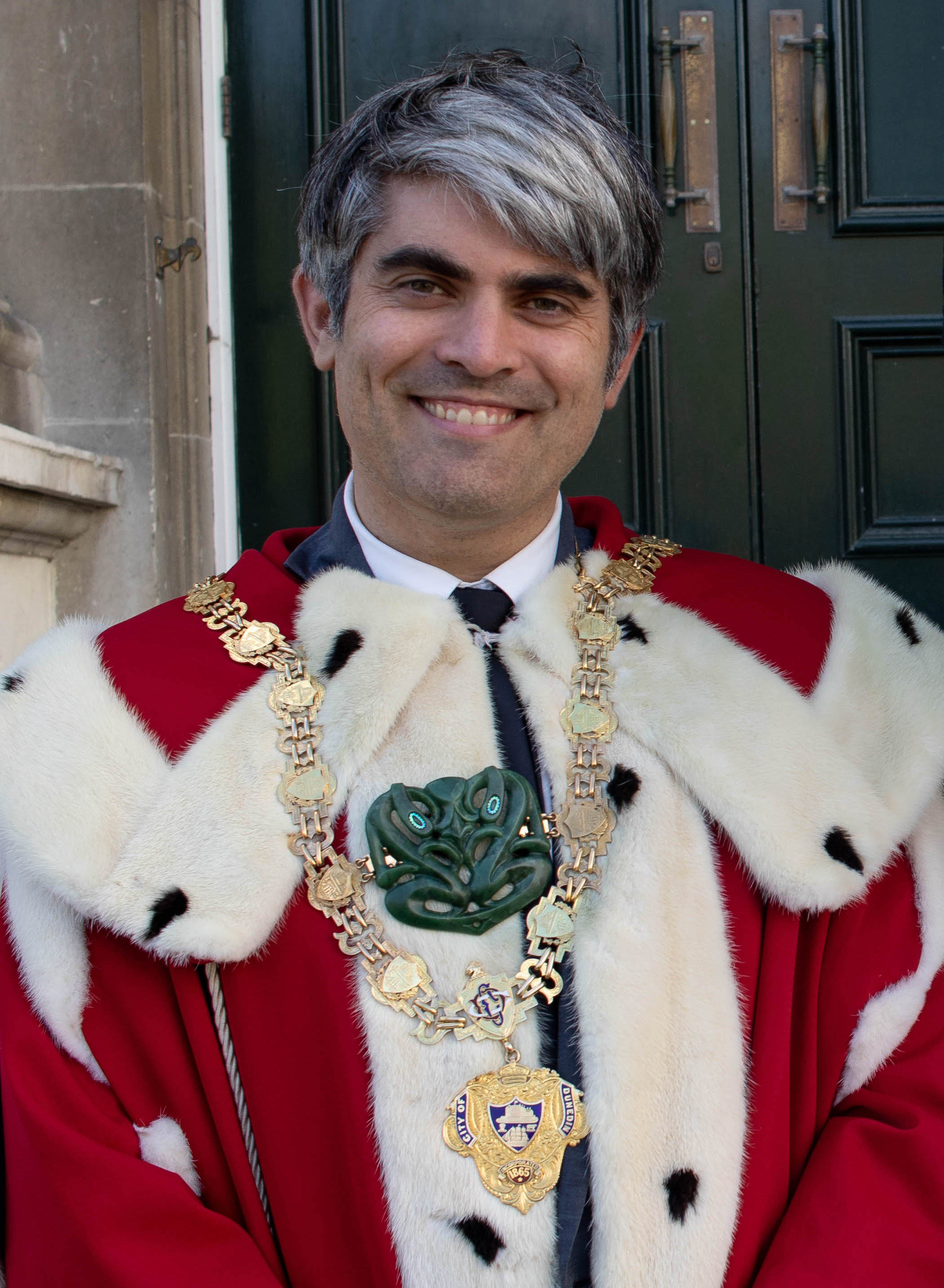
Aaron Hawkins

== Events ==
=== January ===
- 29 December 2020 to 3 January – Riots between inmates and prison guards at Waikeria Prison, causing major fire damage to the complex.
- 1 January – A bomb threat closes Gisborne Airport, causing evacuations and delayed flights.

=== February ===
- 2 February – Lead is found in water of two Otago towns, Waikouaiti and Karitane.
- 9 February:

- Māori Party co-leader and Member of Parliament Rawiri Waititi is not allowed to speak because he was wearing a traditional pendant rather than a tie.
- The Minister of Local Government appoints a Crown commission chaired by Anne Tolley to take over all of Tauranga City Council's governance responsibilities, including the vacant position of mayor.

- 13 February – The Government pays NZ$40 million in compensation to 212 kiwifruit orchardists and Te Puke–based post harvest operator Seeka in order to settle a class action lawsuit alleging that the Government was liable for losses caused by a Pseudomonas syringae (PSA) outbreak in 2010.
- 15 February – COVID-19 in New Zealand: Auckland moves to Alert Level 3, while the rest of New Zealand moves to Alert Level 2.
- 17 February – COVID-19 in New Zealand: Auckland moves to Alert Level 2 from midnight while the rest of New Zealand reverts to Alert Level 1 from midnight.
- 21 February – COVID-19 in New Zealand: Auckland moves to Alert Level 1 at midnight.
- 27 February – COVID-19 in New Zealand: Auckland moves back into an Alert Level 3 lockdown for the next seven days while the rest of New Zealand moves back to an Alert Level 2.

=== March ===
- 2 March – the Government announces a review into drug-purchasing agency Pharmac's timeliness and decision-making process.
- 5 March:
  - A tsunami warning is issued following a 7.1 M earthquake at 2.27 am near East Cape and Gisborne.
  - A 7.4M earthquake at 6.40am hits the Kermadec Islands.
  - A tsunami threat and warning is issued for New Zealand after a 8.1 M earthquake in the Kermadec Islands. The Beehive Bunker has been activated. Tsunami land threat was dropped at 1.20pm by GNS to a beach and marine threat. The national tsunami advisory was later dropped at 3.43pm.
  - COVID-19 in New Zealand: Jacinda Ardern announces that Auckland will move to Alert Level 2 lockdown from Alert Level 3, with the rest of New Zealand moving down to Alert Level 1, at 6am, on 7 March. The Ardern ministry will review the alert level of Auckland at the start of the weekend following the alert downgrade.
- 7 March – COVID-19 in New Zealand: Auckland moves to Alert Level 2, with the rest of New Zealand moving to Alert Level 1.
- 12 March – COVID-19 in New Zealand: Auckland moves to Alert Level 1 at midday.

=== April ===
- 19 April – COVID-19 in New Zealand: Quarantine-free travel with Australia begins.
- April – New Zealand's longest running television advertisement of Auckland Glass stops. It first aired in 1996.

=== May ===
- 10 May – Four people are injured during a stabbing attack at a Countdown supermarket in central Dunedin.
- 17 May – COVID-19 in New Zealand: Quarantine-free travel with the Cook Islands begins.
- 20 May – The 2021 Budget is delivered.
- 24 May – Dame Cindy Kiro is announced as the next Governor-General.
- 30 May – A state of emergency is announced in Ashburton, Selwyn and Timaru districts as torrential rain hits the Canterbury region.

=== June ===
- 7 June – The 2021 Queen's Birthday Honours are announced.
- 19 June – A tornado hit the southern Auckland suburb of Papatoetoe, killing one man and injuring two others.
- 22 June – COVID-19 in New Zealand: New Zealand pauses the travel bubble with New South Wales as cases of COVID-19 surge in Sydney.
- 23 June – COVID-19 in New Zealand: The Wellington Region moves to Alert Level 2, following a positive case of the delta variant who flew to Wellington from Sydney. No outbreak occurred.
- 29 June – A state of emergency is declared in Wellington due to "coastal hazards".

=== July ===
- 2 July – The government releases the dates of the Matariki public holiday for the next thirty years.
- 16 July:
  - A state of emergency is declared in the Buller District due to flooding. An emergency is declared in Marlborough the following day.
  - Farming advocacy group Groundswell NZ stage the nationwide "Howl of a Protest" campaign to protest the Government's freshwater, biodiversity, winter grazing, climate change, and Clean Car Package rebate scheme.
- 23 July – New Zealand athletes begin competing at the 2020 Summer Olympics.

=== August ===
- 8 August – New Zealand athletes finish competing at the 2020 Summer Olympics.
- 17 August – COVID-19 in New Zealand: New Zealand enters Alert Level 4, following a positive case of the Delta Variant of COVID-19 in Auckland.
- 24 August to 5 September – Athletes compete at the 2020 Summer Paralympics.

=== September ===
- 1 September – COVID-19 in New Zealand: New Zealand except for Auckland and Northland moved to Alert Level 3.
- 3 September – Seven people are injured during a stabbing attack at a Countdown supermarket in LynnMall, West Auckland. The attacker was shot and killed by police.
- 8 September – COVID-19 in New Zealand: New Zealand except for Auckland moved to Alert Level 2.
- 14 September – The Māori Party (Māori: Te Pāti Māori) launch a petition to rename the official name of the nation to Aotearoa and restore Māori placenames by 2026.
- 16 September – Three daughters are murdered by their mother, Lauren Dickason.
- September – The average New Zealand house price passes $1 million for the first time.

=== October ===
- 21 October:
  - Dame Cindy Kiro is sworn in as the 22nd Governor-General of New Zealand.
  - Prime Minister Ardern announces an agreement on a New Zealand–United Kingdom Free Trade Agreement, promising zero-tariffs and a $970m economic boost.
- October – The last demolition in Christchurch's residential red zone is completed.

=== November ===
- 4 November – A state of emergency is declared in Tairawhiti due to flooding.
- 25 November – Judith Collins loses a confidence vote as leader of the National Party after her handling over a historic allegation regarding Simon Bridges. Shane Reti becomes interim leader.
- 30 November – Christopher Luxon is elected leader of the National Party.

=== December ===
- 2 December – COVID-19 in New Zealand: The alert level system is dropped in favour of the new traffic light system at 11:59 pm. Northland, Auckland, Taupō, Rotorua, Kawerau, Whakatane, Ōpōtiki, Gisborne, Wairoa, Whanganui and Ruapehu regions initially moved to 'Red' while the rest of the country was moved into 'Orange.'.
- 16 December – The 2021 New Zealand bravery awards are announced.
- 31 December – The 2022 New Year Honours are announced.

== Holidays and observances ==
Public holidays in New Zealand in 2021 are as follows:

- 1 January – New Year's Day
- 2 January – Day after New Year's Day
- 4 January – Day after New Year's Day observed (Note: If a holiday falls on a weekend, it is observed on the Monday or Tuesday following the actual date. If an employee would normally have worked on the Saturday or Sunday, the holiday will be observed on that date.)
- 6 February – Waitangi Day
- 8 February – Waitangi Day observed
- 2 April – Good Friday
- 5 April – Easter Monday
- 25 April – Anzac Day
- 26 April – Anzac Day observed
- 7 June – Queen's Birthday
- 25 October – Labour Day
- 25 December – Christmas Day
- 26 December – Boxing Day
- 27 December – Christmas Day observed
- 28 December – Boxing Day observed

== Sports ==
=== Horse racing ===
==== Harness racing ====
- Auckland Cup – cancelled due to COVID-19
- New Zealand Cup – Copy That
- Rowe Cup – Sundees Son

==== Thoroughbred racing ====
- Auckland Cup – Ocean Billy
- New Zealand Cup – Mondorani
- Wellington Cup – Waisake

=== Olympics ===
- New Zealand sends a team of 225 competitors across 21 sports.

Gold	Silver	Bronze	Total
7	6	7	20

=== Paralympics ===
Gold	Silver	Bronze	Total
6	3	3	12

=== Rowing ===
- New Zealand Secondary School Championships (Maadi Cup)
  - Maadi Cup (boys' U18 eight) – Christ's College
  - Levin Jubilee Cup (girls' U18 eight) – Rangi Ruru Girls' School
  - Star Trophy (overall points) – Rangi Ruru Girls' School

=== Shooting ===
- Ballinger Belt – Mike Collings (Te Puke)

== Births ==
- 18 September – Willydoit, Thoroughbred racehorse

== Deaths ==
=== January ===
- 6 January – Alan Burgess, cricketer (Canterbury), world's oldest living first-class cricketer (since 2020) (born 1920).
- 8 January
  - John Hicks, Olympic field hockey player (1968) (born 1938).
  - Stewart McKnight, cricketer (Otago) and curler (born 1935).
- 12 January – John Ward, cricketer (Canterbury, national team) (born 1937).
- 15 January – Bill Whitehead, rugby league manager (born 1931).
- 17 January – Tom Prebble, educationalist and university administrator (Massey University) (born 1945).
- 18 January – Ash Gardiner, rugby union player (Taranaki, national team) (born 1946).
- 20 January
  - Doug Bowden, cricketer (Central Districts) (born 1927).
  - Bill Sheat, lawyer and arts advocate (born 1930).
- 23 January – Phil Bishop, herpetologist (University of Otago) (born 1957).
- 26 January
  - Ben Te Haara, Māori Anglican priest, Bishop of Te Tai Tokerau (1992–2001) (born 1932).
  - Peter Thorburn, rugby union player (Auckland) and coach (North Harbour, national sevens team, United States national team) (born 1939).
  - Peter Vere-Jones, actor (Pukemanu, Shortland Street, The Hobbit: The Desolation of Smaug) (born 1939).
- 30 January – Bill Hammond, artist (born 1947).
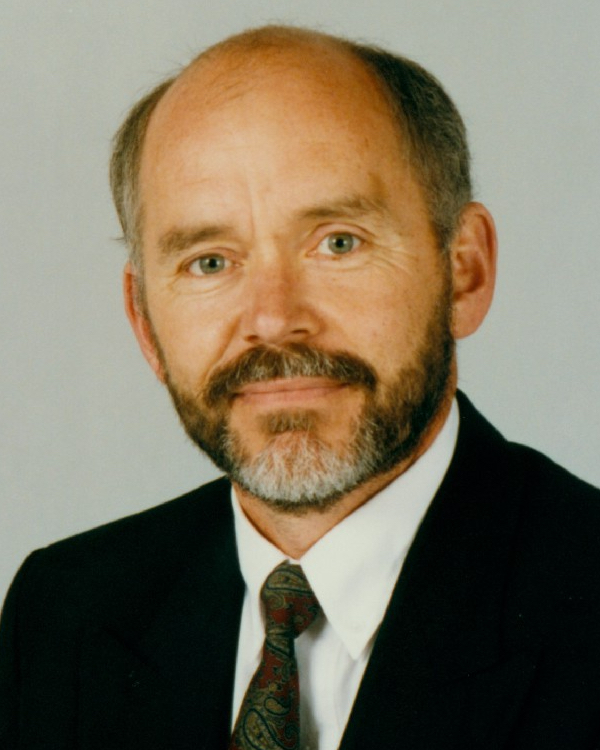
Tom Prebble

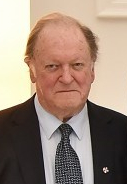
Bill Sheat

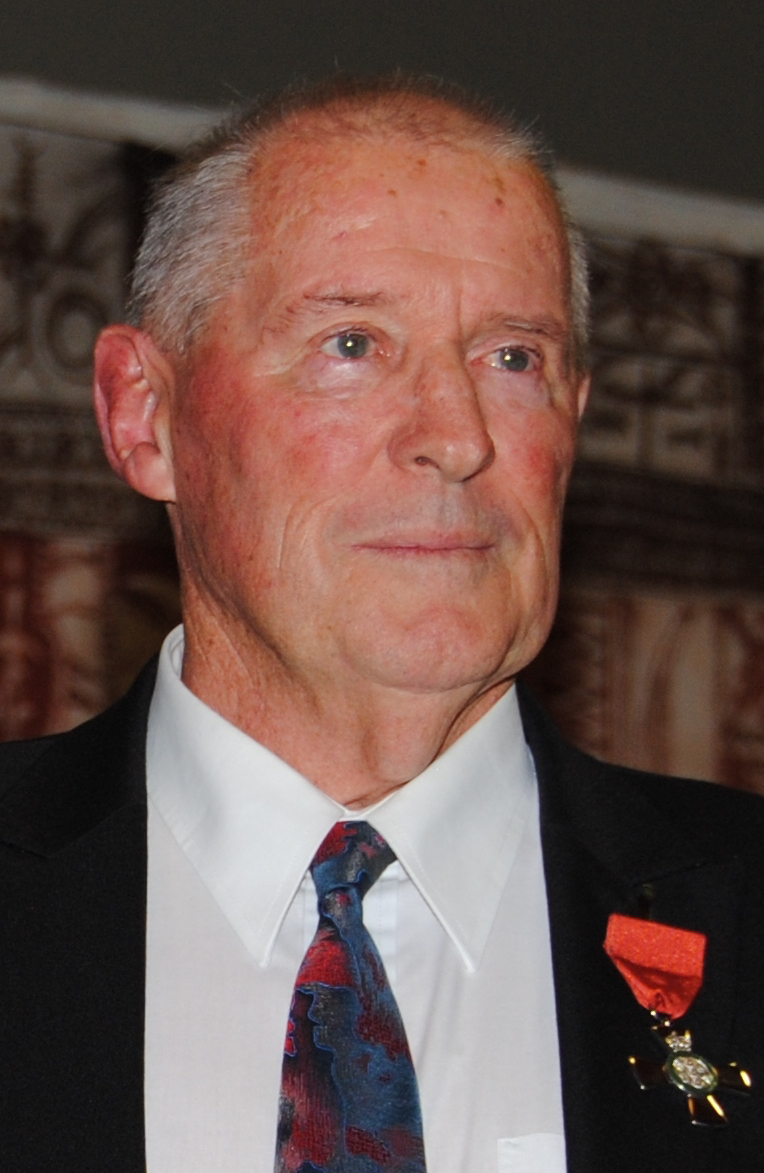
Peter Thorburn

=== February ===
- 3 February – Peter Nicholls, sculptor (Toroa) (born 1936).
- 4 February – Solomon Faine, microbiologist (Monash University) (born 1926).
- 6 February – Bruce Taylor, cricketer (Canterbury, Wellington, national team) (born 1943).
- 22 February – Peter Rattray, cricketer (Canterbury) (born 1958).
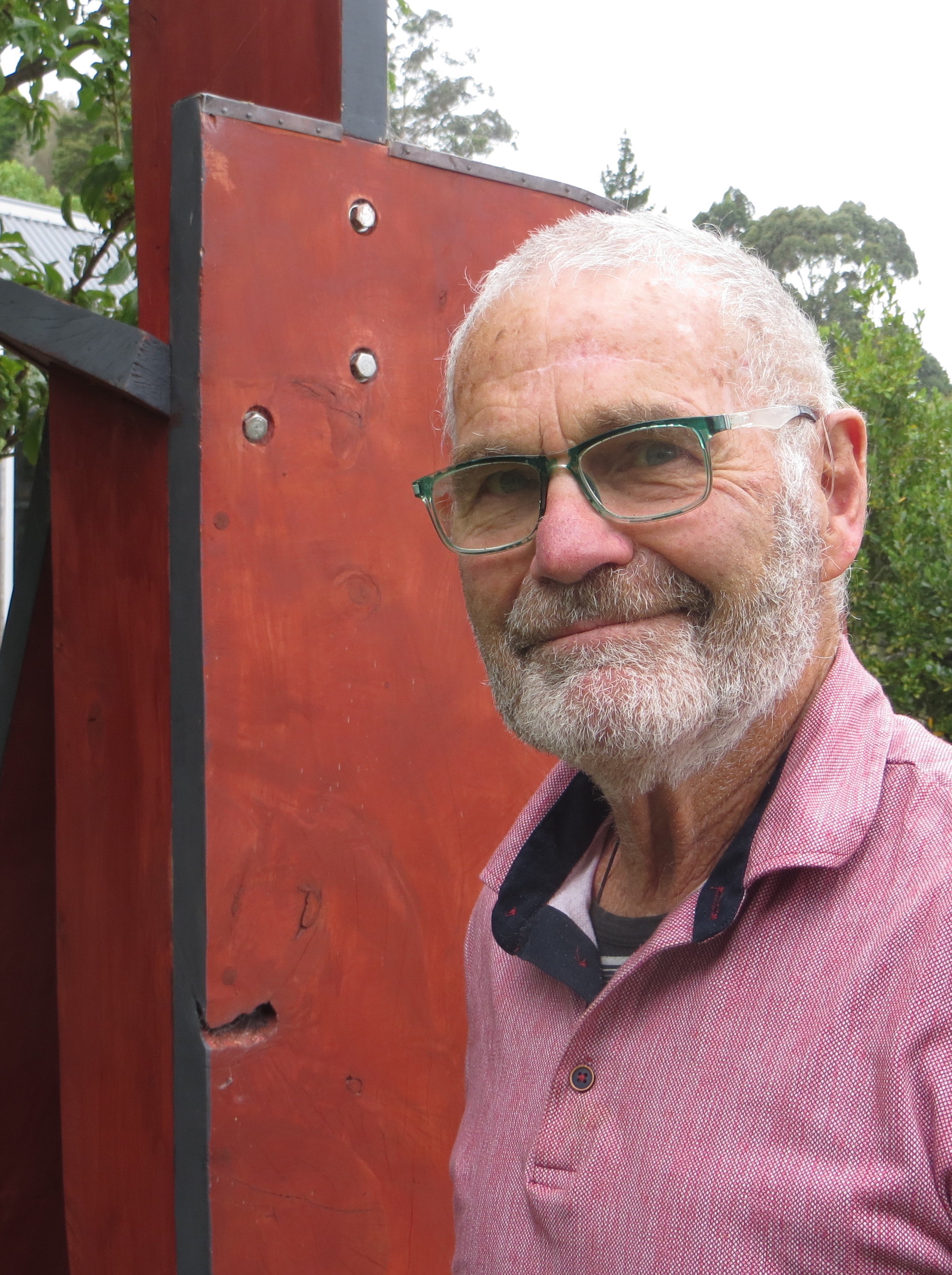
Peter Nicholls

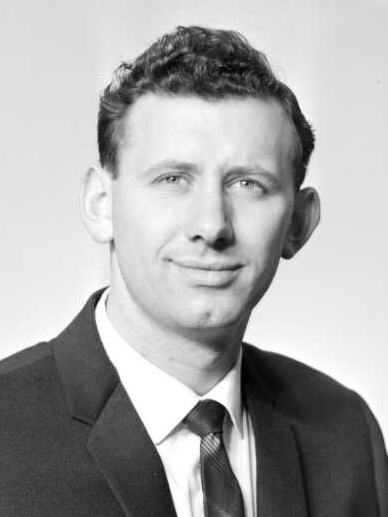
Bruce Taylor

=== March ===
- 3 March – Jonathan Temm, lawyer, president of the New Zealand Law Society (2010–2013), Queen's Counsel (since 2019) (born 1962).
- 5 March – Francis Small, civil engineer and scouting leader, managing director of New Zealand Rail / Tranz Rail (1972–2000), president of IPENZ (1996–1997), Bronze Wolf Award (1999) (born 1946).
- 12 March – Avenal McKinnon, art historian and writer, director of the New Zealand Portrait Gallery (2005–2014) (born 1949).
- 15 March – Miriama Rauhihi Ness, Māori activist (Ngā Tamatoa, Polynesian Panthers) and social worker (born 1951).
- 18 March – David Braithwaite, property developer and local politician, Mayor of Hamilton (2001–2004) (born 1937).
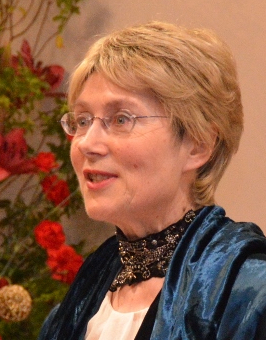
Avenal McKinnon

=== April ===
- 3 April – John Edgar, sculptor and medallist (born 1950).
- 8 April – John da Silva, Olympic (1956) and British Empire and Commonwealth Games (1958) wrestler, boxer and youth worker (born 1934).
- 15 April – Leon van den Eijkel, artist (born 1940).
- 17 April – John Ogilvie, cricketer (Wellington) (born 1931).
- 18 April
  - Mary Earle, food technologist (Massey University) (born 1929).
  - Iain Gallaway, cricketer (Otago), rugby union referee, lawyer and sports commentator, president of New Zealand Cricket (1997–2000), chair of the Broadcasting Standards Authority (1989–1995) (born 1922).
- 19 April – Mike Dormer, cricketer (Auckland) (born 1937).
- 20 April – Karen Trillo, Commonwealth Games lawn bowls player (1998, 2010) (born 1959).
- 27 April – Dave Cull, television presenter (Home Front), writer, and local politician, mayor of Dunedin (2010–2019) (born 1950).
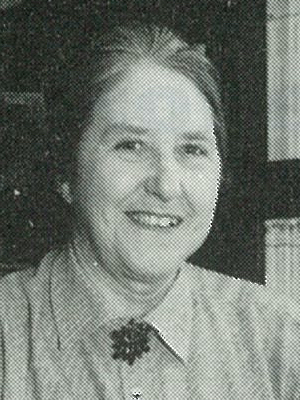
Mary Earle

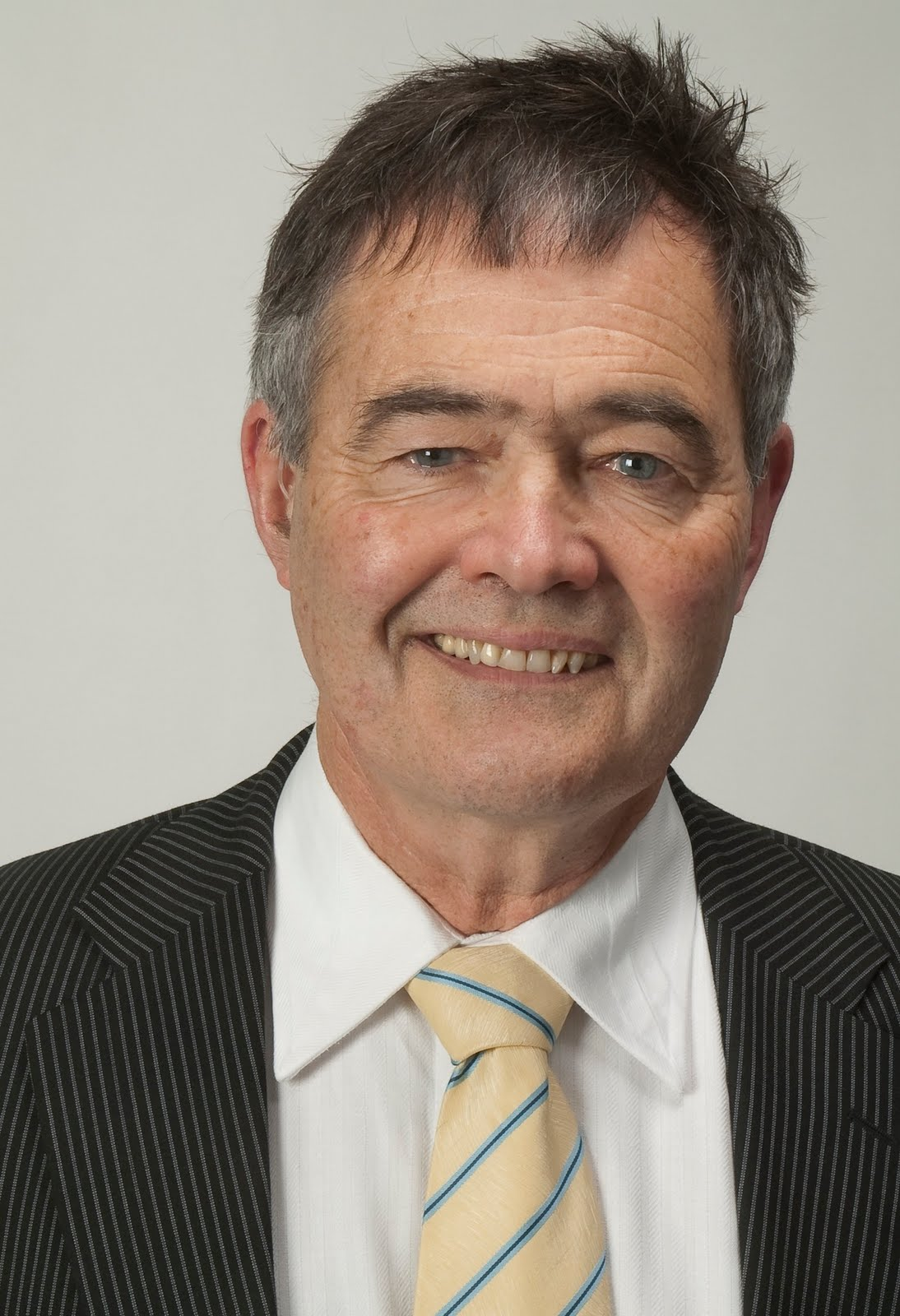
Dave Cull

=== May ===
- 3 May – Steve McKean, basketball coach (national team) (born c. 1944).
- 4 May – Margaret Forsyth, world champion netball player (1979, 1987), netball coach (Waikato Bay of Plenty Magic) and local politician, Hamilton city councillor (2010–2016, since 2019) (born 1961).
- 8 May
  - George Skudder, rugby union player (Waikato, New Zealand Māori, national team) (born 1948).
  - Rana Waitai, politician, MP for Te Puku O Te Whenua (1996–1999) (born 1942).
- 10 May – Jenny King, librarian (University of Waikato) (born 1929).
- 14 May – David McPhail, comedian (A Week of It), actor (Letter to Blanchy, Seven Periods with Mr Gormsby) and writer (Letter to Blanchy) (born 1945).
- 15 May – Emily Mair, opera singer, pianist, and vocal coach (Victoria University of Wellington) (born 1928).
- 17 May
  - Nan Kinross, nurse and nursing academic (Massey University) (born 1926).
  - Janet Shackleton, hurdler, British Empire Games bronze medallist (1950) (born 1928).
- 21 May – Merv Norrish, diplomat and public servant, ambassador to the United States (1978–1980), secretary of foreign affairs (1980–1988) (born 1926).
- 23 May – Ross Taylor, geochemist and planetary scientist (Australian National University) (born 1925).
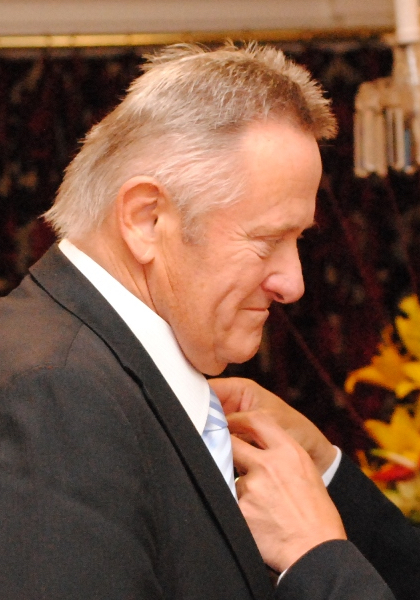
Steve McKean

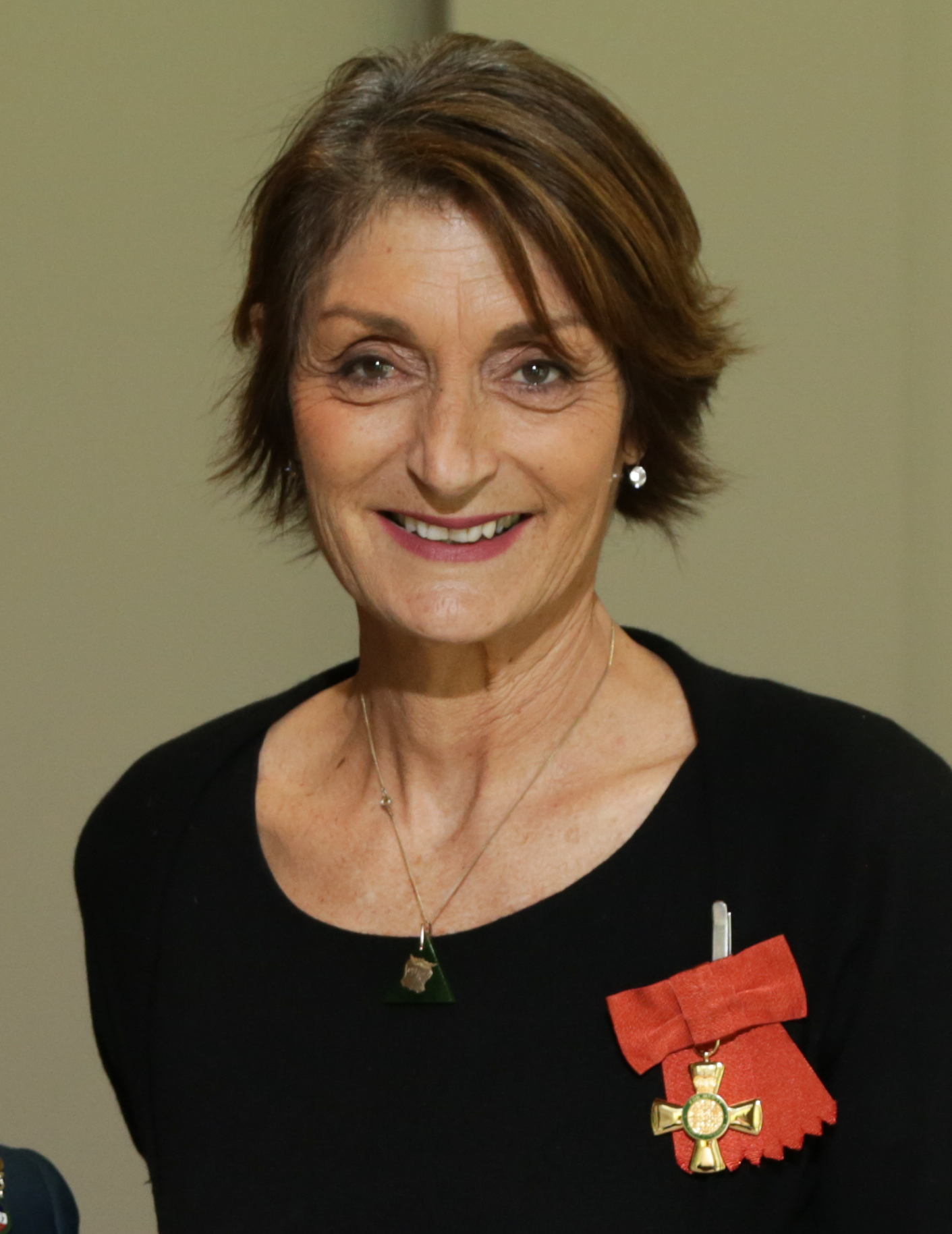
Margaret Forsyth

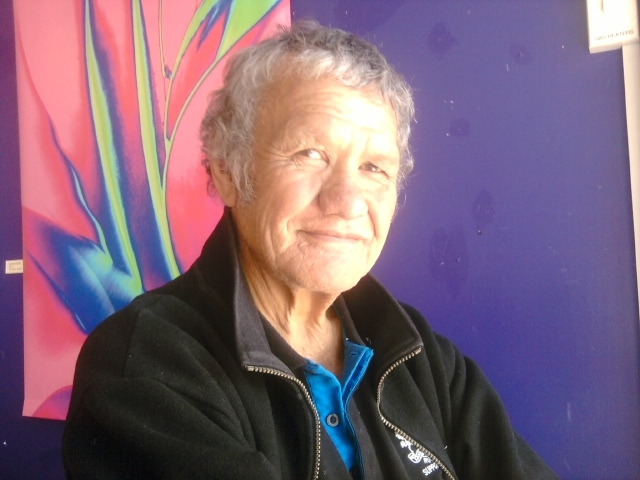
Rana Waitai

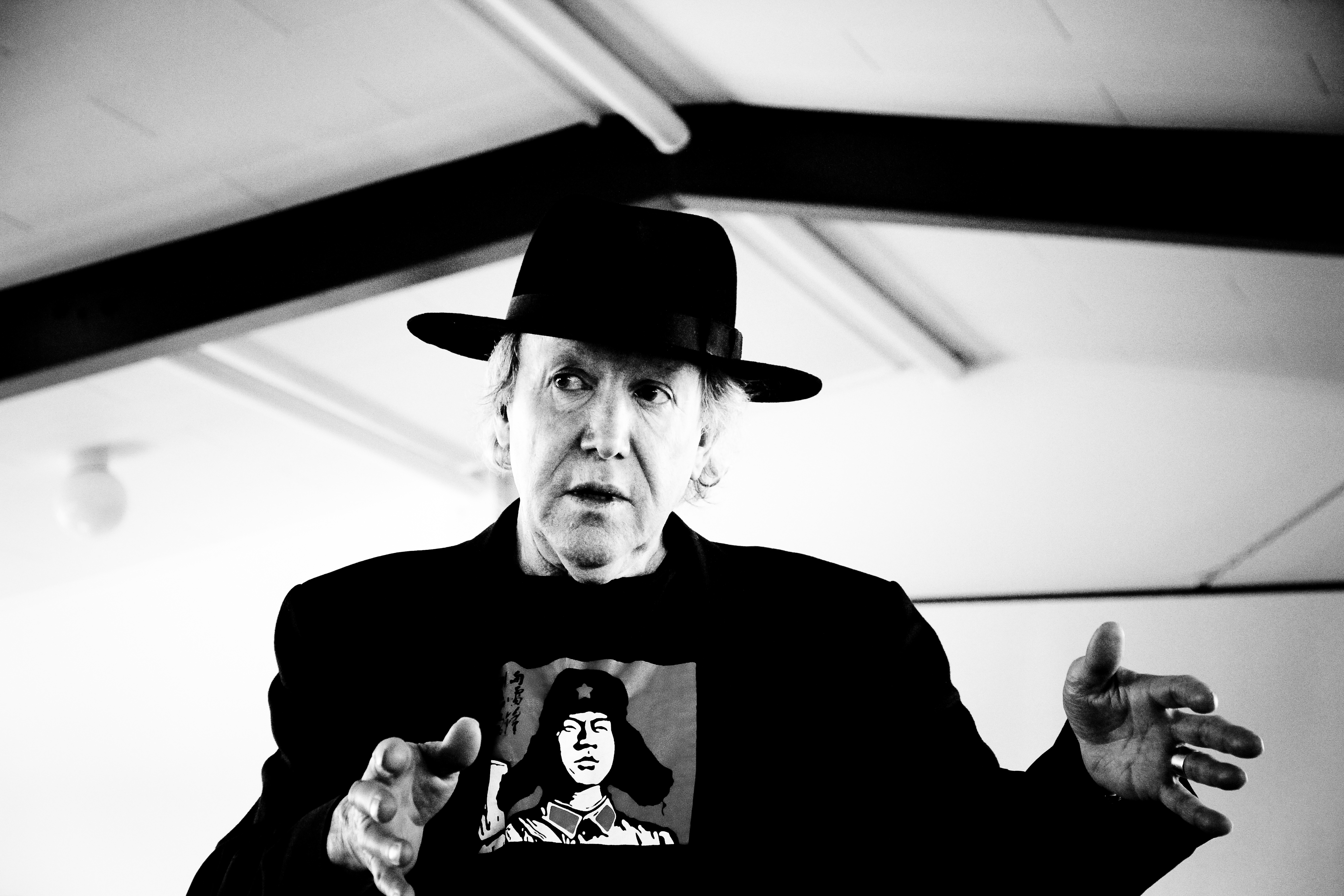
David McPhail

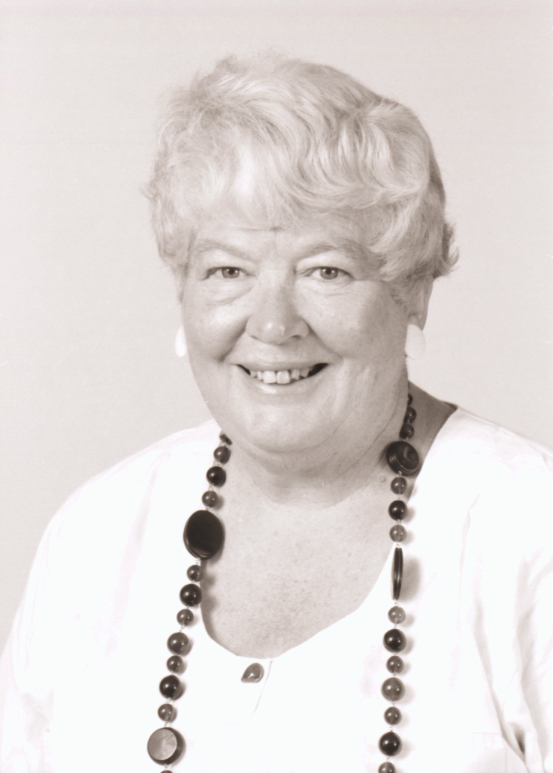
Nan Kinross

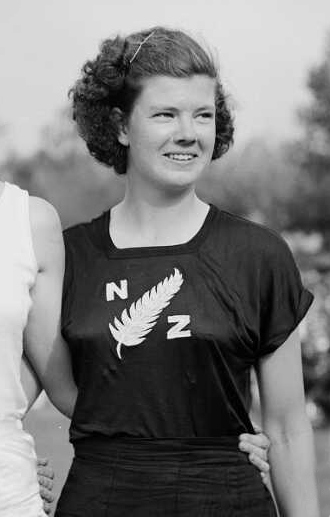
Janet Shackleton

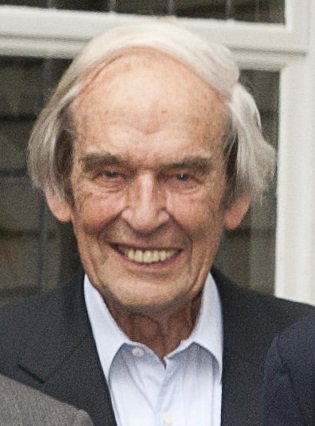
Merv Norrish

=== June ===
- 1 June – Ian Shearer, politician, MP for Hamilton East (1975–1984), Minister for the Environment (1981–1984), Minister of Science and Technology (1981–1984), Minister of Broadcasting (1981–1984) (born 1941).
- 2 June
  - Vonnie Cave, photographer, camellia grower and gardening writer (born 1928).
  - Les Rackley, boxing trainer (Jeff Rackley, Les Rackley) (born 1929).
- 4 June – Tilly Hirst, world champion netball player (1967) (born 1941).
- 7 June – Richard Nunns, Hall of Fame traditional Māori instrumental musician (born 1945).
- 9 June
  - Shane Dowsett, rugby league player (Otahuhu, Auckland, national team) (born c. 1947).
  - Steve Mrkusic, architect (born 1928).
- 11 June
  - Dame Georgina Kirby, Māori leader and women's advocate, president of the Māori Women's Welfare League (1983–1987) (born 1936).
  - Ron Sang, architect (Brian Brake House), art collector (born 1938).
- 12 June – Robert Edgcumbe, 8th Earl of Mount Edgcumbe, peer (born 1939).
- 14 June
  - Sir Eion Edgar, Hall of Fame businessman and philanthropist (Edgar Centre), chancellor of the University of Otago (1999–2003), Senior New Zealander of the Year (2010) (born 1945).
  - Sir Ian Hassall, paediatrician and children's advocate, Children's Commissioner (1989–1994) (born 1941).
- 16 June – John Osmers, Anglican priest and anti-apartheid activist, Bishop of Eastern Zambia (1995–2002) (born 1935).
- 17 June – Fane Flaws, musician (Blerta, The Spats, The Crocodiles), songwriter and artist (born 1951).
- 19 June – Colin Loader, rugby union player (Wellington, national team) (born 1931).
- 20 June – Frank Albrechtsen, association footballer (national team) (born 1932).
- 24 June – Tom Flaws, cricketer (Otago) (born 1932).
- 25 June – John Sigley, cricketer (Wellington) (born 1931).
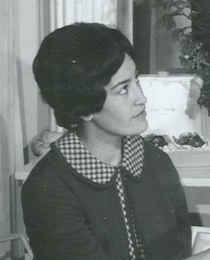
Tilly Hirst

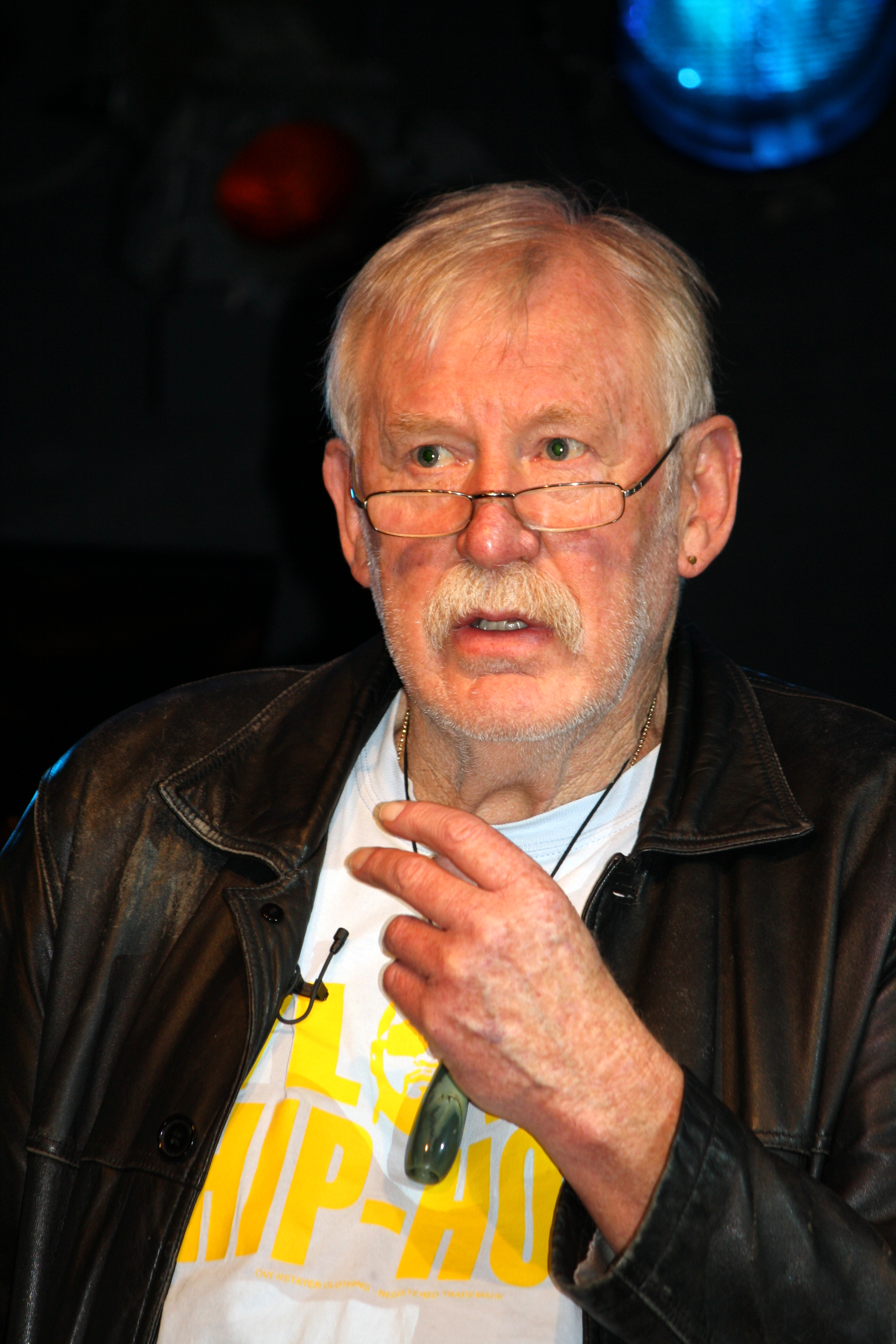
Richard Nuns

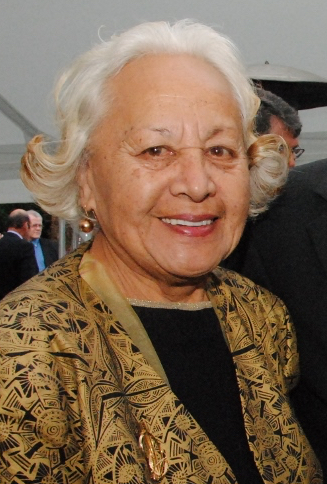
Dame Georgina Kirby

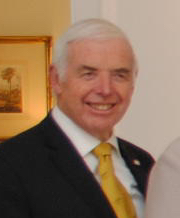
Sir Eion Edgar

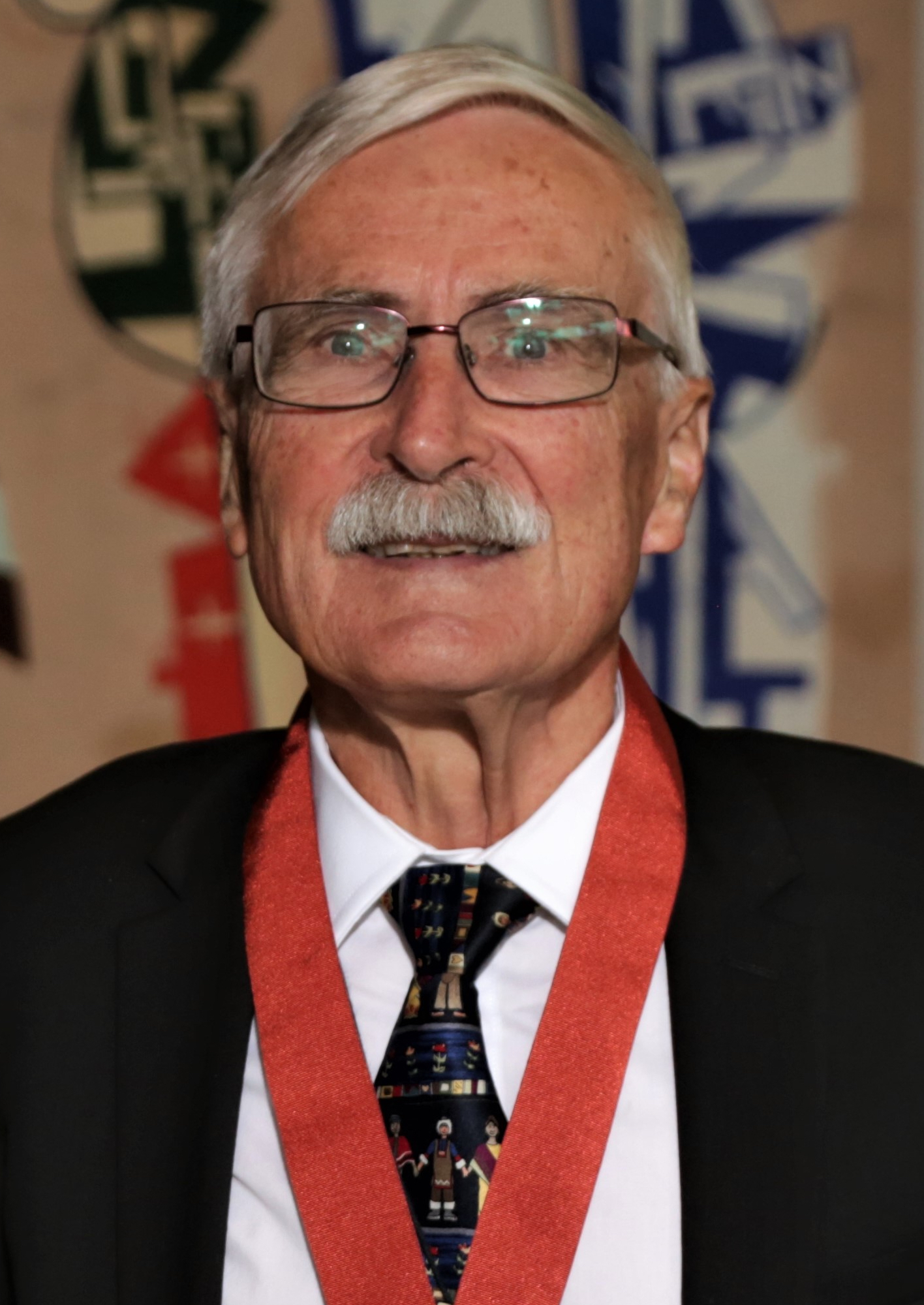
Sir Ian Hassall

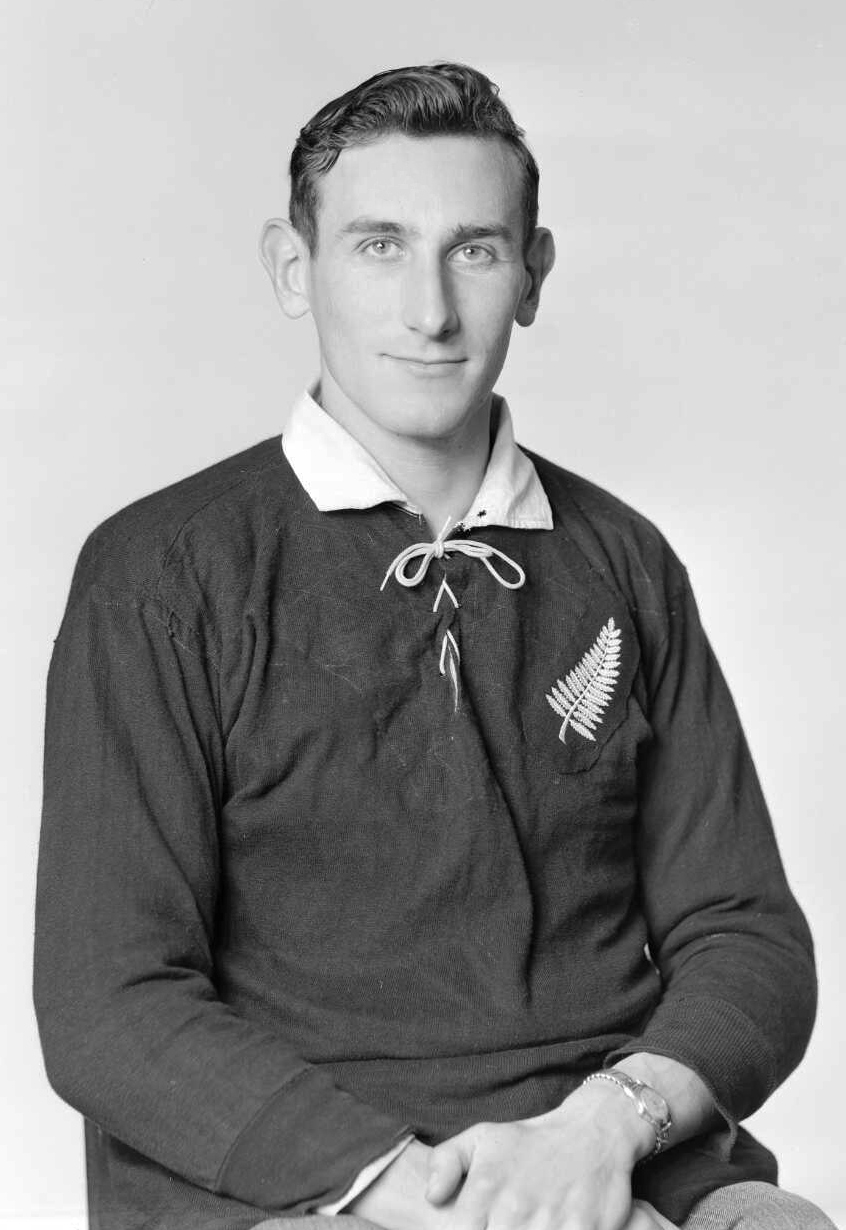
Colin Loader

=== July ===
- 5 July – Vivienne Cassie Cooper, planktologist and botanist (DSIR) (born 1926).
- 6 July – Mary Fama, applied mathematician (DSIR, CSIRO) (born 1938).
- 9 July
  - Betty Gilderdale, children's author, Margaret Mahy Award (1994), Children's Literature Association Award for Services to Children's Literature (1999) (born 1923).
  - Ngaire Lane, Olympic swimmer (1948) (born 1925).
- 11 July – George Petersen, biochemist (University of Otago), Fellow of the Royal Society of New Zealand (since 1985), Rutherford Medal (2003) (born 1933).
- 15 July – Bruce Watt, rugby union player (Wanganui, Canterbury, national team) and coach (born 1939).
- 17 July – Jonathan White, landscape artist and conservationist (born 1938).
- 18 July – Philip Sherry, newsreader (NZBC and TV One Network News, Morning Report, 3 National News) and local politician, Auckland Regional Councillor (1995–2004), Bay of Plenty Regional Councillor (2004–2016) (born 1933).
- 19 July – Paratene Matchitt, artist (City to Sea Bridge) (born 1933).
- 23 July – Fred Fastier, pharmacologist (University of Otago) (born 1920).
- 28 July – Malcolm McCaw, cricketer (Wellington) and accountant (born 1930).
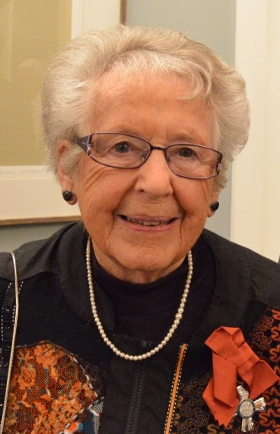
Betty Gilderdale

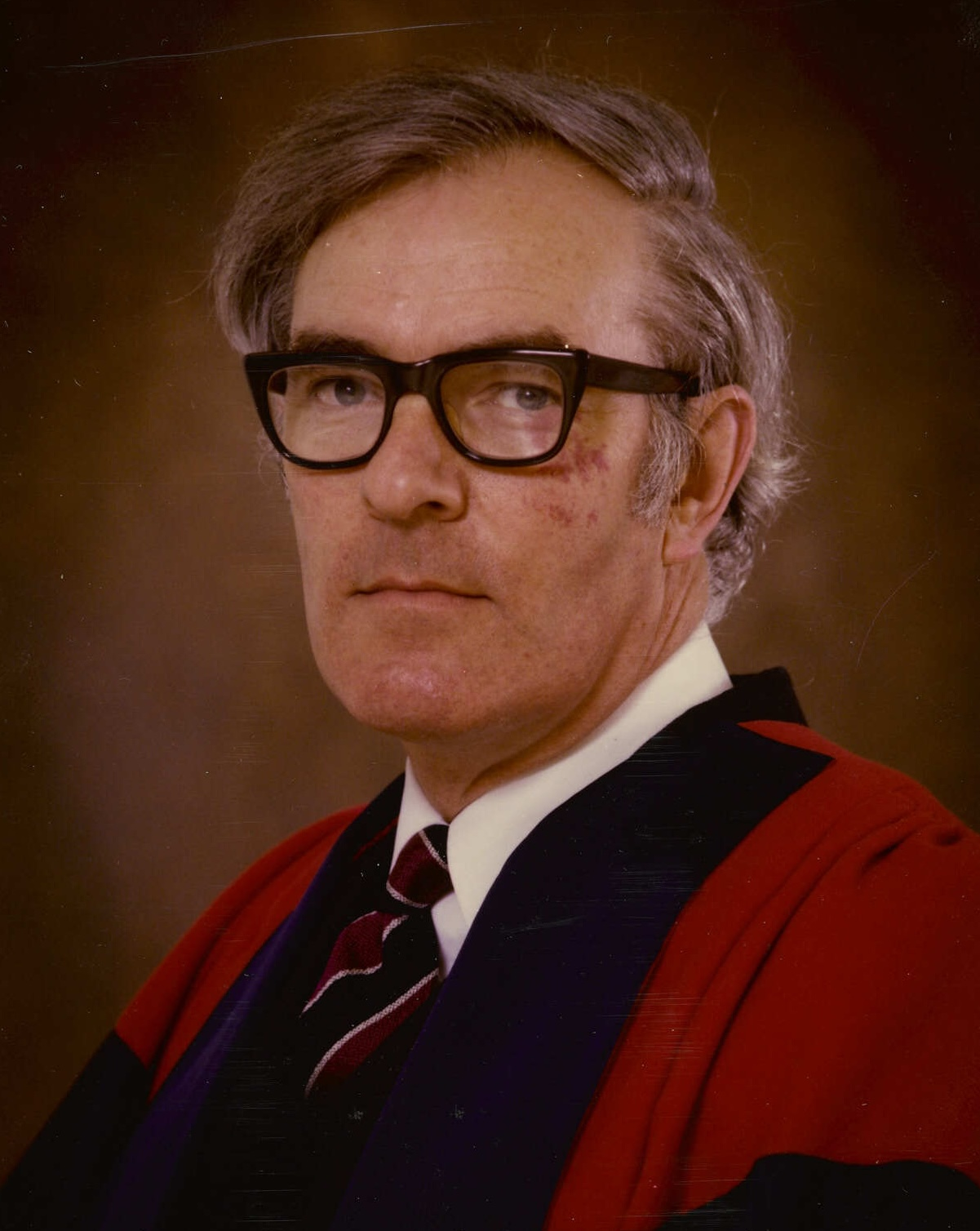
George Petersen

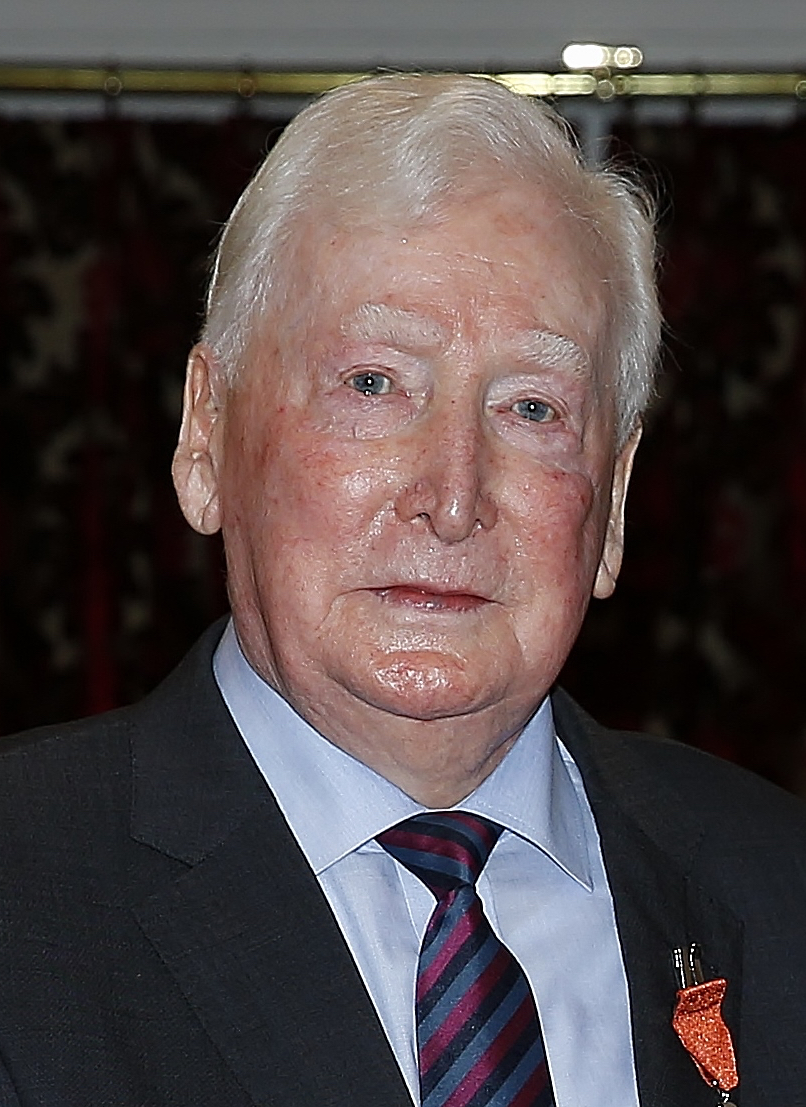
Philip Sherry

=== August ===
- 1 August – Kihi Ngatai, Māori leader (Ngāi Te Rangi) and horticulturalist, member of the Waitangi Tribunal (2008–2015) (born 1930).
- 3 August – Brian Maunsell, Olympic boxer (1964) (born 1937).
- 4 August – Graham McRae, motor racing driving, SCCA L&M Continental 5000 Championship winner (1972), Indianapolis 500 Rookie of the Year (1973) (born 1940).
- 5 August
  - Brian Henderson, Hall of Fame television and radio broadcaster (Nine News, Bandstand), Gold Logie Award (1968) (born 1931).
  - Murray Rose, politician, MP for Otago Central (1969–1972) (born 1939).
- 7 August – Mark Weedon, rugby union player (Bay of Plenty, North Harbour, Crusaders) (born 1968).
- 8 August – Perry Harris, rugby union player (Manawatu, national team) (born 1946).
- 9 August – Olivia Podmore, Olympic (2016) and Commonwealth Games (2018) cyclist (born 1997).
- 10 August
  - Don McKechnie, cricketer (Otago) and cricket umpire (born 1944).
  - John Riordan, jockey, Auckland Cup (1960, 1972), W. S. Cox Plate (1963) (born 1936).
  - Peter Whittle, mathematician (DSIR, University of Cambridge), John von Neumann Theory Prize (1997), Fellow of the Royal Society (since 1978) (born 1927).
- 11 August – Sir David Levene, Hall of Fame businessman and philanthropist (born 1929).
- 14 August – Francis Mossman, actor (Shortland Street, Spartacus: Vengeance, The Horizon) (born 1988).
- 15 August
  - Greg Rowlands, rugby union player (Bay of Plenty, national team) (born 1947).
  - Gary Woollard, rugby league player (Wellington, Auckland, national team) (born 1942).
- 16 August – Marilynn Webb, artist and educator (Otago Polytechnic), Frances Hodgkins Fellow (1974), Te Tohu mō Te Arikinui Dame Te Atairangikaahu (2018) (born 1937).
- 17 August – Tom Larkin, public servant and diplomat, ambassador to Japan (1972–1976) (born 1917).
- 18 August – Austin Mitchell, academic (University of Otago, University of Canterbury), broadcaster (Calendar), writer (The Half-Gallon Quarter-Acre Pavlova Paradise) and politician, MP for Great Grimsby (1977–2015) (born 1934).
- 19 August
  - Sir Michael Cullen, politician, MP (1981–2009), Minister of Social Welfare (1987–1990), Minister of Finance (1999–2008), Deputy Prime Minister (2002–2008) (born 1945).
  - Lyn Hartley, local-body politician, Mayor of Kawerau (1986–2001) (born 1941).
- 22 August – Danny Campbell, rugby league player (Wigan, Runcorn Highfield, national team) (born 1956).
- 23 August – Gary Tricker, painter and printmaker (born 1938).
- 24 August
  - Bruce Culpan, rower, British Empire and Commonwealth Games silver medallist (1950, 1954) (born 1930).
  - Harry Kent, Olympic track cyclist (1972), British Commonwealth Games gold medallist (1970), world championship silver medallist (1970), Lonsdale Cup (1970) (born 1947).
- 25 August – Max Cryer, broadcaster, entertainer and writer, Entertainer of the Year (1973), Benny Award (1977) (born 1935).
- 28 August – Joye Evans, radiographer and guiding leader, New Zealand Girl Guides chief commissioner (1983–1988) (born 1929).
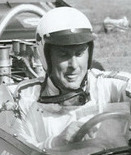
Graham McRae

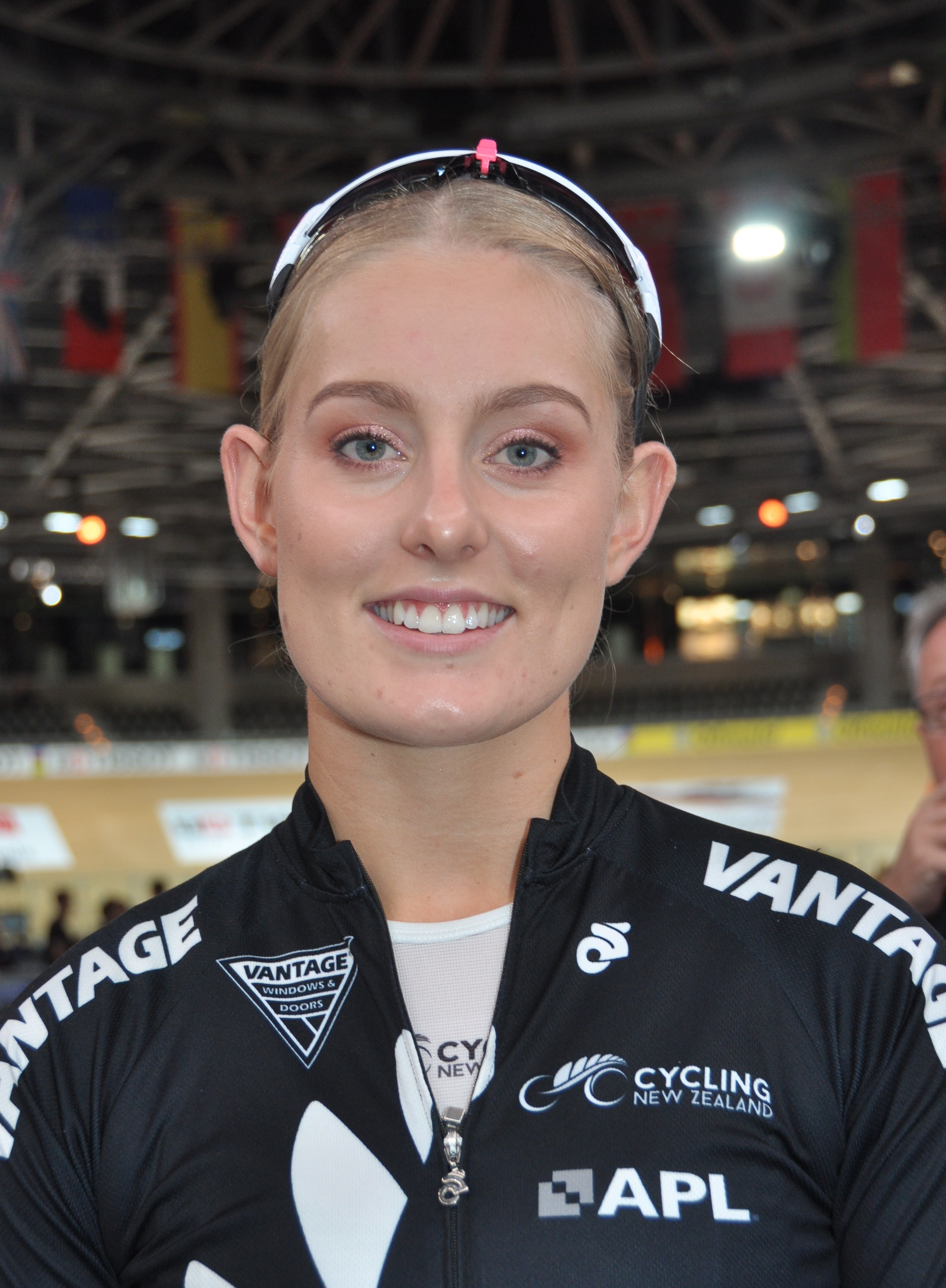
Olivia Podmore

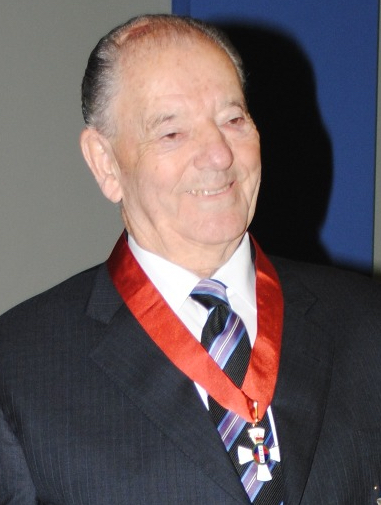
Sir David Levene

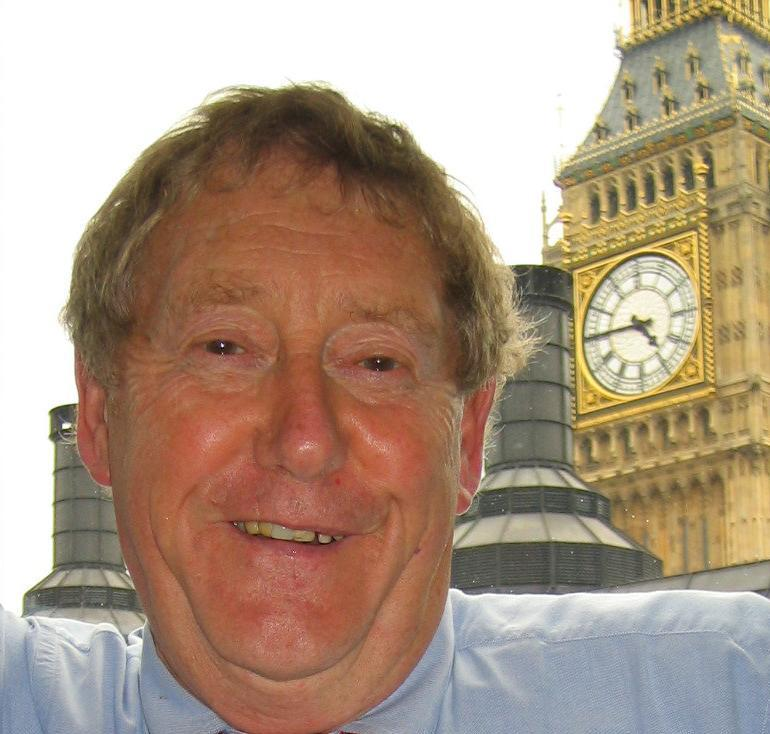
Austin Mitchell

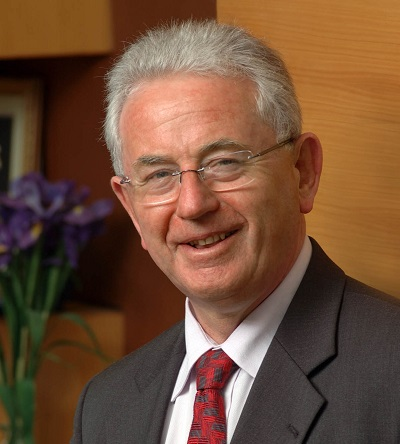
Sir Michael Cullen

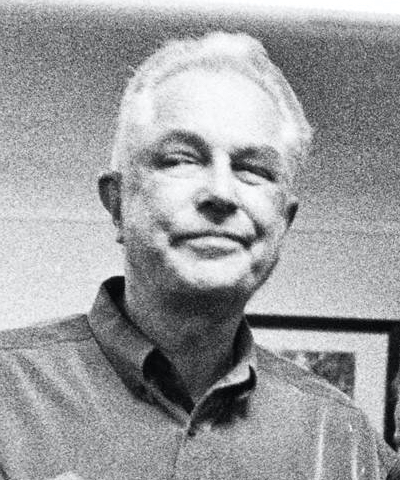
Max Cryer

=== September ===
- 1 September
  - Noel Dellow, cricketer (Canterbury) (born 1929).
  - Alison Gray, writer and social researcher (born 1943).
- 4 September
  - Martin Thompson, artist (born 1956).
  - Lydia Wevers, literary academic (Victoria University of Wellington), editor and critic (born 1950).
- 5 September – Viv Stephens, cricket player (Wellington, Central Districts, national team) and administrator (born 1953).
- 6 September
  - Billy Apple, pop artist, Arts Foundation of New Zealand Icon (since 2018) (born 1935).
  - Peter Arnold, cricket player (Canterbury, Northamptonshire) and administrator, president of Northamptonshire County Cricket Club (1996–2000) (born 1926).
- 17 September – Angela Ballara, historian, member of the Waitangi Tribunal (2003–2020) (born 1944).
- 19 September – Dame Jocelyn Fish, women's rights advocate and local politician, Piako county councillor (1980–1989), president of the National Council of Women (1986–1990) (born 1930).
- 23 September
  - Taito Phillip Field, politician, MP for Otara (1993–1996) and Māngere (1996–2008), leader of the New Zealand Pacific Party (2008–2010) (born 1952).
  - John Mitchell, historian (born 1941).
- 24 September – Waka Nathan, rugby union player (Auckland, national team), selector and administrator, Tom French Cup (1962, 1966), president of the Auckland Rugby Union (2003–2004) (born 1940).
- 30 September
  - Dorothea Brown, librarian (Christchurch City Libraries) (born 1938).
  - Jenny Kirk, politician, MP for Birkenhead (1987–1990), North Shore city councillor (1995–2001) (born 1945).
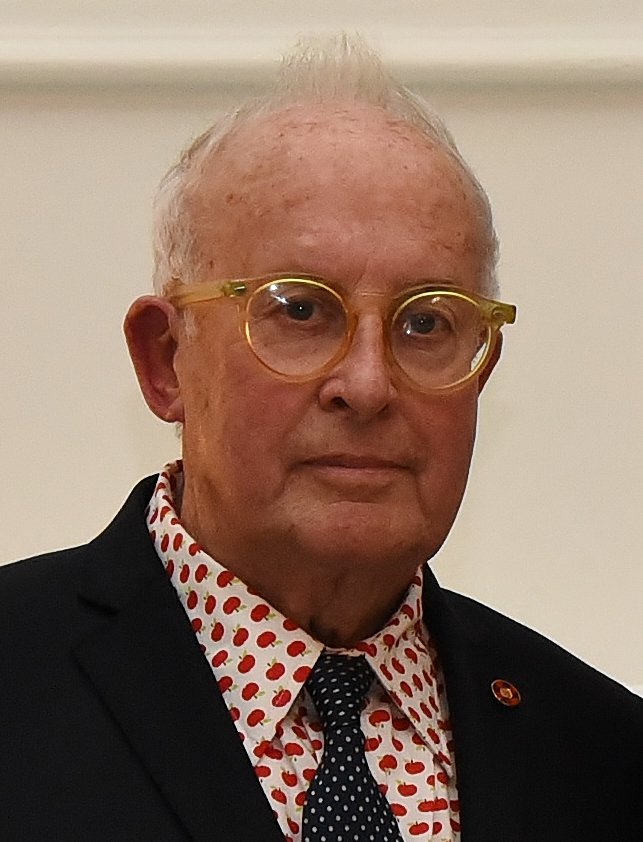
Billy Apple

Taito Phillip Field

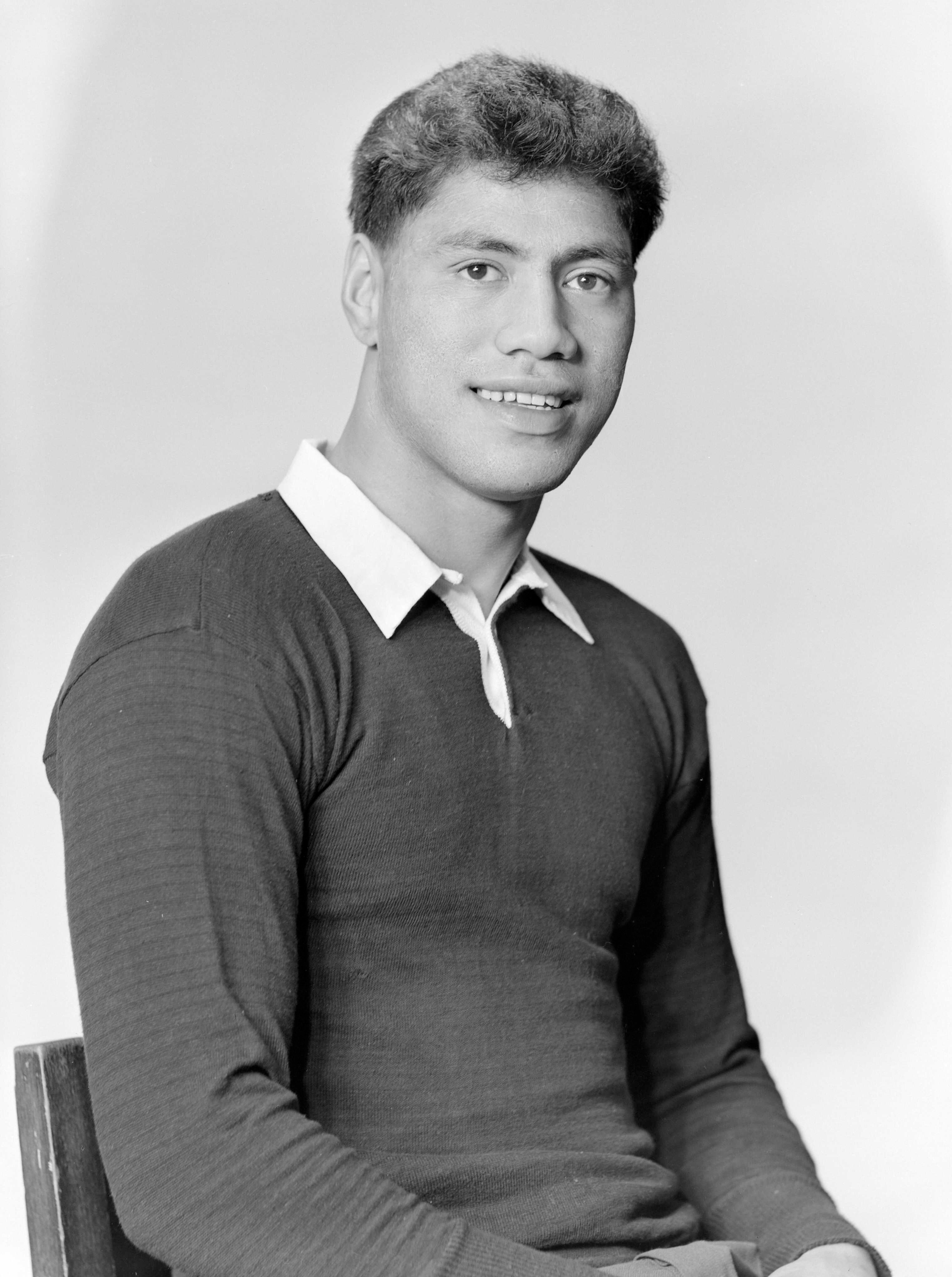
Waka Nathan

=== October ===
- 1 October – Earle Wells, Hall of Fame sailor, Olympic champion (1964) (born 1933).
- 4 October
  - Laurie Davidson, Hall of Fame yacht designer (NZL 32) (born 1926).
  - John Hastie, Commonwealth Games sport shooter (1978, 1982) and gunsmith, Ballinger Belt (1982) (born 1938).
  - Joy Watson, children's author, Gaelyn Gordon Award (2000) (born 1938).
- 5 October – Pam Williams, Hall of Fame businesswoman and philanthropist (born 1933).
- 6 October – Sir Noel Anderson, lawyer and judge, president of the Court of Appeal (2004–2006), Supreme Court justice (2006–2008), Queen's Counsel (since 1986) (born 1944).
- 8 October
  - Jack Manning, architect (Majestic Centre), NZIA Gold Medal (2011) (born 1928).
  - Ian Ormond, association footballer (Blockhouse Bay, national team) (born 1949).
- 11 October – Barry Mora, operatic baritone (Gelsenkirchen Opera House, Frankfurt Opera House) (born 1940).
- 13 October – Ray Cranch, rugby league player (Auckland, national team) and administrator (born 1923).
- 18 October
  - Fred Goodall, cricket umpire (born 1938).
  - Sean Wainui, rugby union player (Taranaki, Chiefs, Māori All Blacks) (born 1995).
- 19 October – Bob Graham, rugby union player (Auckland, Junior All Blacks) and coach (Auckland) (born 1936).
- 31 October – Dame Catherine Tizard, zoologist (University of Auckland), television personality (Beauty and the Beast), and politician, mayor of Auckland City (1983–1990), governor-general (1990–1996) (born 1931).
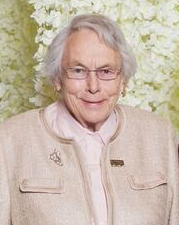
Pam Williams

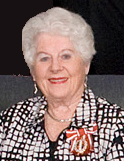
Dame Catherine Tizard

=== November ===
- 13 November
  - Michael Corballis, psychologist and cognitive neuroscientist (University of Auckland), Rutherford Medal (2016) (born 1936).
  - Jack Kiddey, cricketer (Canterbury) (born 1929).
  - Keith Mann, British Empire and Commonwealth Games fencer (1962, 1966), and sports administrator (born 1932).
- 15 November – Sir Rod Weir, Hall of Fame stock and station agent and businessman (born 1927).
- 16 November – John Luxton, politician, MP for Matamata (1987–1996) and Karapiro (1996–1999), National list MP (1999–2002), Minister of Police (1994–1996), Minister for Land Information (1996–1999) (born 1946).
- 23 November – Robert Ellis, artist and professor of fine arts (Elam School of Fine Arts) (born 1929).
- 27 November – Jimmy O'Dea, trade unionist and activist (born 1935).
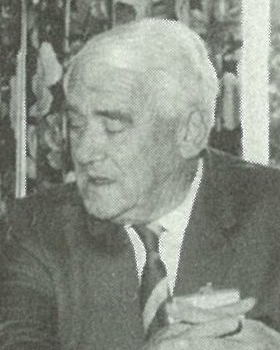
Sir Rod Weir

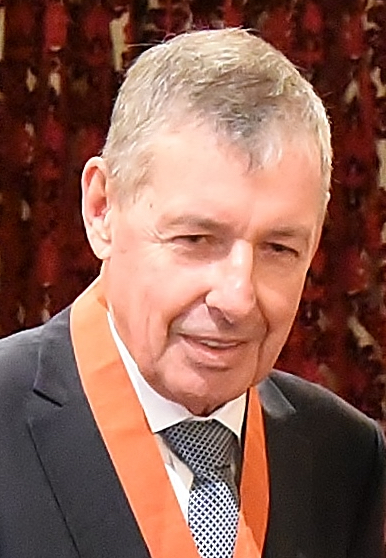
John Luxton

=== December ===
- 2 December – Lyndsey Leask, Hall of Fame softball administrator (born 1935).
- 6 December – Tom Horton, air force pilot and commander (Royal New Zealand Air Force, Royal Air Force) (born 1919).
- 9 December
  - Brian Aldridge, cricket umpire (born 1940).
  - Julie Brougham, Olympic equestrian (2016) (born 1954).
- 12 December – Maʻafu Tukuiʻaulahi, Tongan noble, deputy prime minister of Tonga (since 2020) (born 1955).
- 19 December – Peter Innes, dentistry academic (University of Adelaide, University of Saskatchewan, University of Otago) (born 1941).
- 24 December – Terry Morrison, rugby union player (Otago, national team) and sprinter (born 1951).
- 26 December – George Johnson, artist (born 1926).
- 27 December – Keri Hulme, writer (The Bone People), Booker Prize (1985) (born 1947).
- 30 December – Billy Harrison, rugby league player (Wellington, national team) (born 1938).
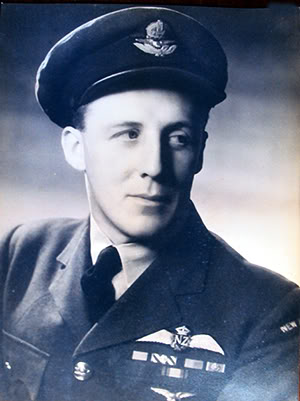
Tom Horton

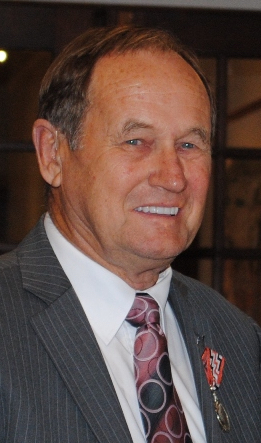
Brian Aldridge

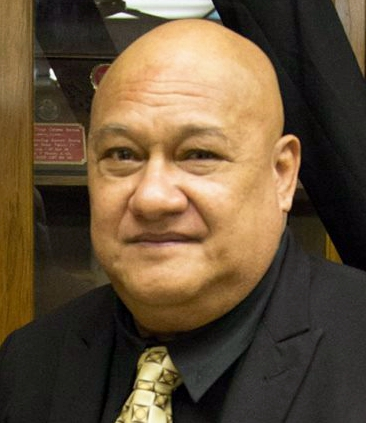
Maʻafu Tukuiʻaulahi

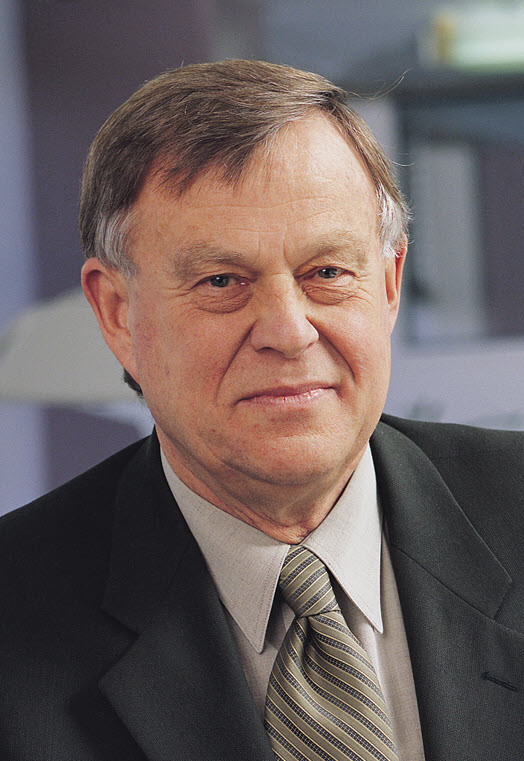
Peter Innes

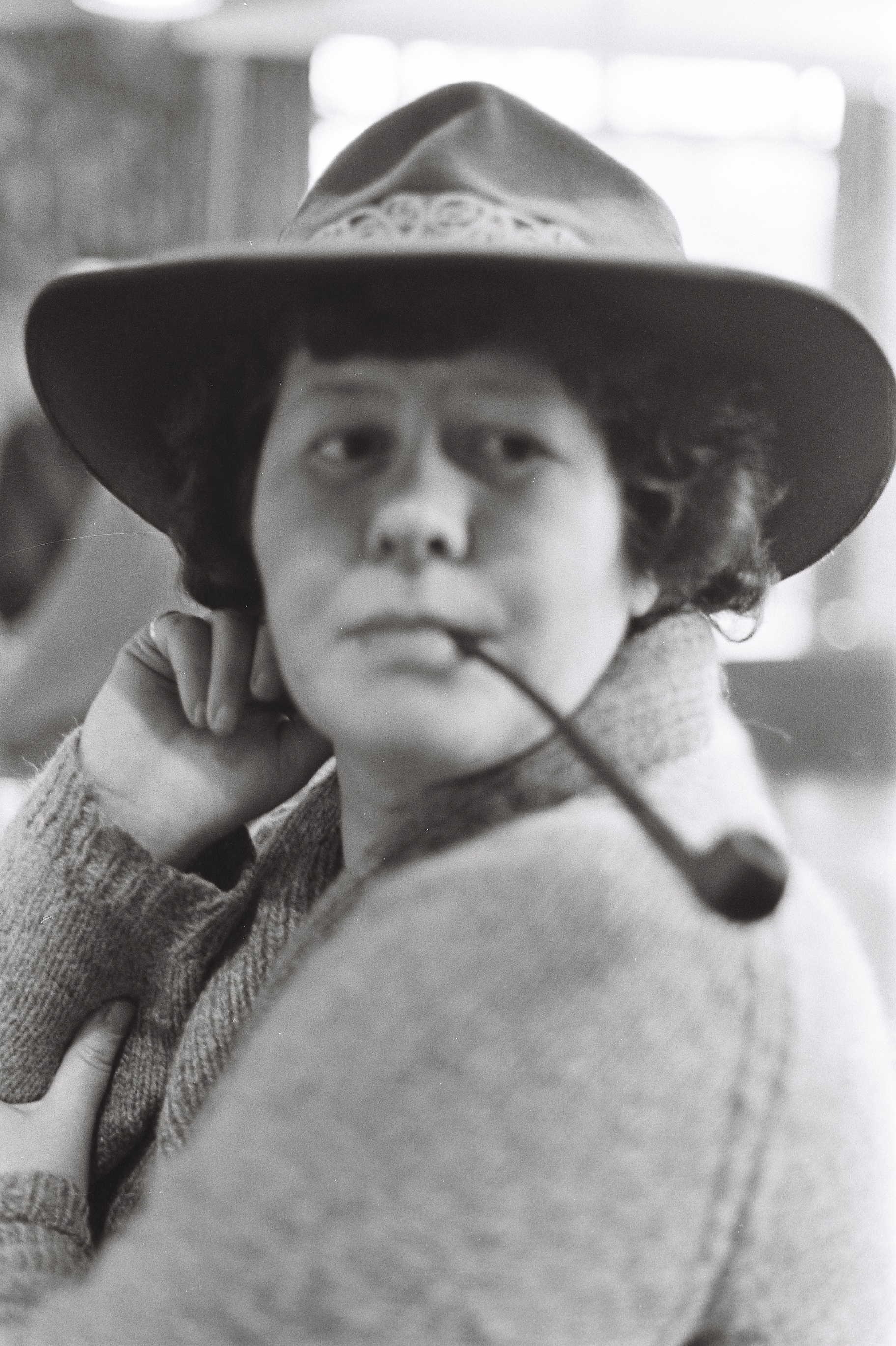
Keri Hulme

=== Exact date unknown ===
- Reg Cooke, rugby league player (Papakura, Auckland, national team) (born 1940).
