= Les Rackley =

New Zealand boxer

Personal information
- Full name: Leslie Frank Rackley
- Born: c.1954 (age 71–72)
- Relatives: Les Rackley (father); Jeff Rackley (brother)

Rugby union career
- Position: Forward
Provincial / State sides
Years	Team	Apps	(Points)
1977	Nelson Bays	3	(4)
Medal record
Men's boxing
Representing New Zealand
British Commonwealth Games
Bronze medal – third place	1974 Christchurch	Middleweight

Leslie Frank Rackley (born c.1954) is a New Zealand former amateur boxer and rugby union player. He won a bronze medal for boxing in the middleweight division at the 1974 British Commonwealth Games.

== Early life and family ==
Rackley was born into a noted sporting family. His father, also called Les Rackley, was a notable New Zealand boxing trainer; his brothers Jeff, Perry, and Dean all represented New Zealand in boxing at either Olympic or Commonwealth Games; and his sisters Margaret and Tish were both national volleyball representatives. Les Rackley Jr was educated at Victory School in Nelson, Nelson Intermediate School, and then Nelson College from 1968 to 1972, where he was a member of the 1st XV rugby team in 1972 and the 1st XI cricket team in 1970 and 1971.

== Boxing ==
Trained by his father, Rackley won New Zealand junior titles at the national junior boxing championships in 1969 and 1970. In 1971 he won the national intermediate welterweight title, and in 1972 he was the New Zealand middleweight champion. He went on to represent New Zealand at the 1974 British Commonwealth Games in Christchurch, winning a bronze medal in the men's middleweight (71–75 kg) division.

== Rugby union ==
A forward, Rackley played for the Rival Rugby Football Club in Nelson. At a provincial level, he played three matches for Nelson Bays in 1977, scoring four points.
