= Peter Rattray =

New Zealand cricketer (1958–2021)

Personal information
- Full name: Peter John Rattray
- Born: 14 September 1958; Christchurch, New Zealand
- Died: 22 February 2021 (aged 62); Christchurch, New Zealand
- Batting: Right-handed
- Bowling: Right-arm off-spin
- Relatives: Sue Rattray (sister)

Domestic team information
- Years: Team
- 1980/81–1984/8: Canterbury

Career statistics
| Competition | FC | LA |
|---|---|---|
| Matches | 22 | 20 |
| Runs scored | 909 | 434 |
| Batting average | 22.72 | 21.70 |
| 100s/50s | 1/3 | 0/2 |
| Top score | 133 | 66 |
| Balls bowled | 11 | 6 |
| Wickets | 0 | 0 |
| Bowling average | – | – |
| 5 wickets in innings | 0 | 0 |
| 10 wickets in match | 0 | n/a |
| Best bowling | 0/1 | 0/11 |
| Catches/stumpings | 11/– | 11/– |
- Source: CricketArchive, 5 March 2021

Peter John Rattray (14 September 1958 – 22 February 2021) was a New Zealand cricketer. He played in 22 first-class and 20 List A matches for Canterbury from 1980 to 1985.

His sister Sue Rattray represented New Zealand in international cricket.

== See also ==
- List of Canterbury representative cricketers
