= Les Rackley (boxing trainer) =

New Zealand boxing trainer (1929–2021)

- Born: Leslie Arthur Rackley; 9 March 1929; West Ham, London, England
- Died: 2 June 2021 (aged 92); Nelson, New Zealand
- Known for: Boxing trainer
- Spouse: Joyce Rackley
- Relatives: Jeff Rackley (son); Les Rackley (son)

Leslie Arthur Rackley (9 March 1929 – 2 June 2021) was a New Zealand boxing trainer. During his career, his boxers won 55 New Zealand championship titles, and he coached the New Zealand boxing team at the 1974 and 1982 Commonwealth Games. His four sons, who he trained, all represented New Zealand internationally.

== Early life and family ==
Rackley was born in West Ham, London, England, on 9 March 1929. He served in the army and merchant navy, and boxed as a welterweight. He migrated to New Zealand in 1949, settling in Nelson, and marrying his wife Joyce not long after. He became a naturalised New Zealand citizen in 1981. Rackley's children enjoyed considerable sporting success: his daughters Margaret and Tish were both New Zealand volleyball representatives; and his sons Jeff, Les, Perry and Dean all represented New Zealand in boxing at Olympic or Commonwealth Games.

== Boxing trainer ==
Active as a boxing trainer from the 1960s to the 1980s, Rackley was known for his strict training regimes and no-nonsense approach. Boxers he trained were noted for their strong defence and scientific boxing, and Rackley was a five-time recipient of the Joe Thwaites Memorial Shield, for the coach of the most scientific senior boxer at the New Zealand national amateur boxing championships. In all, his fighters won 55 New Zealand titles and 20 South Island titles.

Seven boxers trained by Rackley represented New Zealand internationally: Jeff Rackley at the 1972 Summer Olympics; Les Rackley at the 1974 British Commonwealth Games; Dean and Perry Rackley at the 1978 Commonwealth Games; Barry Galbraith at the 1985 Oceania Championships in Melbourne; Graeme McNamara; and Alan McNamara, who turned professional and won the Australasian light heavyweight title.

In 2012, Rackley was inducted as a Sport Tasman Legend of Sport.

== Death ==
Rackley died in Nelson on 2 June 2021, aged 92. His wife, Joyce, died a few months later, on 18 November 2021.
