= Gary Tricker =

New Zealand painter and printmaker (1938–2021)

- Born: Gary Walter Morice Tricker; 24 September 1938; Wellington, New Zealand
- Died: 23 August 2021 (aged 82); Greytown, New Zealand
- Known for: Painting; Printmaking

Gary Walter Morice Tricker (24 September 1938 – 23 August 2021) was a New Zealand painter and printmaker. In 1966, he was awarded a Queen Elizabeth II Arts Council scholarship. His prints and etchings featured themes including black cats, trains, rugby and railway clocks, often with a landscape background. He bequeathed almost all of his 500 artworks to Waikato Museum. Other institutions that hold Tricker's work in their collections include the Museum of New Zealand Te Papa Tongarewa and the Govett-Brewster Art Gallery.
