= Steve Mrkusic =

New Zealand architect (1928–2021)

- Born: Stephen Victor Mrkusic; 10 June 1928; Te Kōpuru, New Zealand
- Died: 9 June 2021 (aged 92); Takapuna, New Zealand
- Education: University of Auckland
- Occupation: Architect
- Buildings: Deanwell School

Stephen Victor Mrkusic (10 June 1928 – 9 June 2021) was a New Zealand architect. He was chief architect for the South Auckland Education Board for over 25 years. During his tenure, Deanwell School in Hamilton, recognised as the first open-plan school in New Zealand, was designed, and completed in 1970. In 2015, the school was awarded a national enduring architecture award by the New Zealand Institute of Architects. The judges described the school as a "pioneering project which introduced open planning to New Zealand schools" and noted that it was "just as radical in its employment of modular design and construction methods".

Mrkusic died in Takapuna on 9 June 2021, one day before his 93rd birthday.
