= Dorothea Brown =

New Zealand librarian (1938–2021)

Dorothea Brown (née Jongejans; 13 August 1938 – 30 September 2021) was a New Zealand librarian.

Brown was born in 1938 in The Hague, Netherlands. Aged 18, she emigrated to New Zealand by herself. She was the first woman to be appointed Christchurch city librarian, and the first woman head of a Christchurch City Council department, as director of human resources.
