= Mary Fama =

New Zealand applied mathematician (1938–2021)

- Born: Mary Elizabeth Duncan; 23 October 1938; Windsor, Berkshire, England
- Died: 6 July 2021 (aged 82); Hastings, New Zealand
- Education: Harvard University
- Spouse: Peter Fama (m. 1968)
- Children: 4
- Scientific career
- Fields: Applied mathematics
- Workplaces: DSIR; CSIRO
- Thesis: The effect of a ring stiffener on the stress in a cylindrical shell with a longitudinal crack (1967)

Mary Elizabeth Fama (née Duncan; 23 October 1938 – 6 July 2021) was a New Zealand applied mathematician who became "a leading international figure" in the analysis of stress and deformation of rock and the application of this analysis to mining. A method she developed for solving analytically the convergence-confinement curve of a circular mining tunnel has been variously called the Duncan-Fama convergence curve, Duncan-Fama analytical method, or Duncan-Fama solution.

== Education and career ==
After early education at a boarding school in Scotland, Fama became a student at Erskine College, Wellington, where she excelled in mathematics but was stripped of her academic honours after being caught rebelling against the school rules. She went on to earn a bachelor's degree at the University of Canterbury and a second bachelor's degree at the University of Oxford.

Returning to New Zealand, she became a researcher at the Department of Scientific and Industrial Research (DSIR) in 1962. In 1964, she took a Fulbright scholarship to Harvard University, and she completed her PhD there in 1967. In 1968, she married and moved with her husband to the Sydney North Shore, and Fama became a junior lecturer at the University of Sydney. In 1970, they returned to New Zealand, and Fama returned to her position at the DSIR. She was appointed to the University of Waikato as a temporary senior lecturer in 1980.

In 1983, they moved back to Australia again, and Fama became a senior scientist for the Commonwealth Scientific and Industrial Research Organisation (CSIRO) in Brisbane, becoming the second woman scientist at the Brisbane centre. She retired in 2010 and returned with her husband to Havelock North in New Zealand.

== Personal life ==
Fama was born on 23 October 1938 in Windsor, England, to a Catholic family of five children; her father was a New Zealander, army officer, and government official. They returned to New Zealand when Fama was ten, living in the Wellington region.

In 1968, she met and married Australian psychiatrist Peter Fama, then working in Auckland but slated to return to Australia. Their first child died soon after childbirth, but they had three more in the early 1970s, all three of whom suffered from Friedreich's ataxia, a genetic degenerative disorder, and died in their 20s and 30s.

Fama suffered for many years from pulmonary tuberculosis, likely contracted as a teenager but not diagnosed until much later. By the 1980s she was diagnosed with bronchiectasis. As a complication of her tuberculosis, she went blind in one eye in 2013.

She died in Hastings on 6 July 2021.
