= Jack Kiddey =

New Zealand cricketer (1929–2021)

Personal information
- Full name: John William Francis Kiddey
- Born: 5 July 1929; Christchurch, New Zealand
- Died: 13 November 2021 (aged 92); Christchurch, New Zealand
- Batting: Right-handed
- Bowling: Left-arm medium

Domestic team information
- Years: Team
- 1956/57–1964/65: Canterbury

Career statistics
Competition	First-class
Matches	44
Runs scored	683
Batting average	11.98
100s/50s	0/0
Top score	44
Balls bowled	10,078
Wickets	141
Bowling average	20.17
5 wickets in innings	5
10 wickets in match	1
Best bowling	7/24
Catches/stumpings	31/–
- Source: Cricinfo, 16 November 2018

John William Francis Kiddey (5 July 1929 – 13 November 2021) was a New Zealand cricketer who played first-class cricket for Canterbury from 1957 to 1965.

Kiddey was a left-arm medium-pace bowler who bowled economically for Canterbury throughout his career, taking his wickets at an average of 20.17 and conceding only 1.69 runs per over. After the 1960–61 season, when he took his best figures of 7 for 24 and 3 for 35 against Northern Districts (match figures of 45–26–59–10) he was considered a possible selection for the tour of South Africa in 1961–62. When Canterbury dismissed Otago for 64 in 1963–64 he had figures of 8–5–8–5.

In a long career in the Christchurch senior competition, Kiddey took 862 wickets for the Riccarton and St Albans clubs, including five or more wickets in an innings 52 times.

Kiddey died in Christchurch in November 2021, aged 92. He and his wife Betty were married for 70 years.
