= Angela Ballara =

New Zealand historian (1944–2021)

- Born: Heather Angela Devitt; 16 August 1944; Kent, England
- Died: 17 September 2021 (aged 77); Wellington, New Zealand
- Spouse: Bruno Ballara
- Children: 6

Academic background
- Education: Victoria University of Wellington
- Theses: Warfare and government in Ngapuhi tribal society, 1814–1833 : institutions of authority and the function of warfare in the period of early settlement, 1814–1833, in the Bay of Islands and related territories (1973); The Origins of Ngati Kahungunu (1991)

Academic work
- Discipline: History
- Sub-discipline: New Zealand Māori history

Heather Angela Ballara (née Devitt; 16 August 1944 – 17 September 2021) was a New Zealand historian who specialised in Māori history. She was appointed a member of the Waitangi Tribunal in 2004. After a short break, she was reappointed to the role in 2015.

She was born on 16 August 1944, and studied at the University of Auckland, graduating with a Bachelor of Arts in history in 1969, and a Master of Arts in history in 1973. Her master's thesis had the title Warfare and government in Ngapuhi tribal society, 1814–1833: institutions of authority and the function of warfare in the period of early settlement, 1814–1833, in the Bay of Islands and related territories. She later completed a PhD at Victoria University of Wellington in 1991 on the origins of Ngāti Kahungunu. An authority on Māori customary history, Ballara was the editorial officer (Māori) for the Dictionary of New Zealand Biography for 15 years.

Ballara died in Wellington on 17 September 2021, aged 77.

== Selected publications ==
- Ballara, Angela (1986). Proud to be white? : a survey of Pakeha prejudice in New Zealand. Auckland: Heinemann. ISBN 0868632929.
- Ballara, Angela (1998). Iwi : the dynamics of Maori tribal organisation from c.1769 to c.1945. Wellington: Victoria University Press. ISBN 0864733283.
- Ballara, Angela (2003). Taua : 'musket wars', 'land wars' or tikanga? : warfare in Maori society in the early nineteenth century. Auckland: Penguin. ISBN 9780143018896.
