= Don McKechnie =

New Zealand cricketer (1944–2021)

Personal information
- Full name: Donald Ernest Cameron McKechnie
- Born: 23 March 1944; Dunedin, Otago, New Zealand
- Died: 10 August 2021 (aged 77); Balclutha, South Otago, New Zealand
- Batting: Right-handed
- Bowling: Slow left-arm orthodox

Domestic team information
- Years: Team
- 1975/76–1980/81: Otago

Career statistics
Competition	First-class	List A
Matches	17	1
Runs scored	278	21
Batting average	11.12	21.00
100s/50s	0/0	0/0
Top score	49*	21
Balls bowled	2,408	60
Wickets	37	2
Bowling average	24.35	18.50
5 wickets in innings	1	0
10 wickets in match	0	0
Best bowling	6/65	2/37
Catches/stumpings	13/–	0/–
- Source: Cricinfo, 22 September 2021

Donald Ernest Cameron McKechnie (23 March 1944 – 10 August 2021) was a New Zealand cricketer and umpire. He was born at Dunedin in Otago in 1944 and educated at King's High School there.

A left-arm spin bowler, McKechnie played 17 first-class matches for Otago between 1975 and 1981. His most successful match was against Auckland in 1975–76, when he took 3 for 71 and 6 for 65 and Otago won by 10 runs. He won the player of the match award in the low-scoring Shell Cup match against Wellington in 1976–77 when he took six wickets and three catches and top-scored in Otago's first innings with 27 batting at number nine.

Later, McKechnie became an umpire, officiating in eight first-class matches between 1986 and 1990. He died in Balclutha on 10 August 2021.
