= John Hicks (field hockey) =

New Zealand field hockey player (1938–2021)

Personal information
- Full name: John William Hicks
- Nationality: New Zealand
- Born: 14 November 1938 Suva, Fiji
- Died: 8 January 2021 (aged 82)

Sport
- Country: New Zealand
- Sport: Field hockey

John Williams Hicks (14 November 1938 – 8 January 2021) was a New Zealand field hockey player. He competed in the men's tournament at the 1968 Summer Olympics.

Hicks died on 8 January 2021, and his ashes were buried at Onerahi Cemetery in Whangārei.
