= Jeff Rackley =

New Zealand boxer (born 1952)

Jeffrey Steven Rackley QSM (born 12 September 1952) is a retired boxer from New Zealand.

== Biography ==
Rackley was born in Nelson, the son of boxing trainer Les Rackley. He attended Nelson College from 1966 to 1971, and was a member of the school's 1st XI cricket team from 1968 to 1970, captaining the side in 1970. He was also a member and captain of the 1st XV rugby team in 1970 and 1971.

Rackley competed at the 1972 Summer Olympics in Munich. There he was defeated in the second round of the Welterweight (-69 kg) by Günther Meier of West Germany.

In the 2008 Queen's Birthday Honours, Rackley was awarded the Queen's Service Medal, for services to sport and the community.

== 1972 Olympic results ==
Below is the record of Jeff Rackley, a New Zealand welterweight boxer who competed at the 1972 Munich Olympics:

- Round of 64: bye
- Round of 32: lost to Günther Meier (West Germany) by decision, 0-5
