= Te Ara Tupua =

New Zealand cycling and walking path

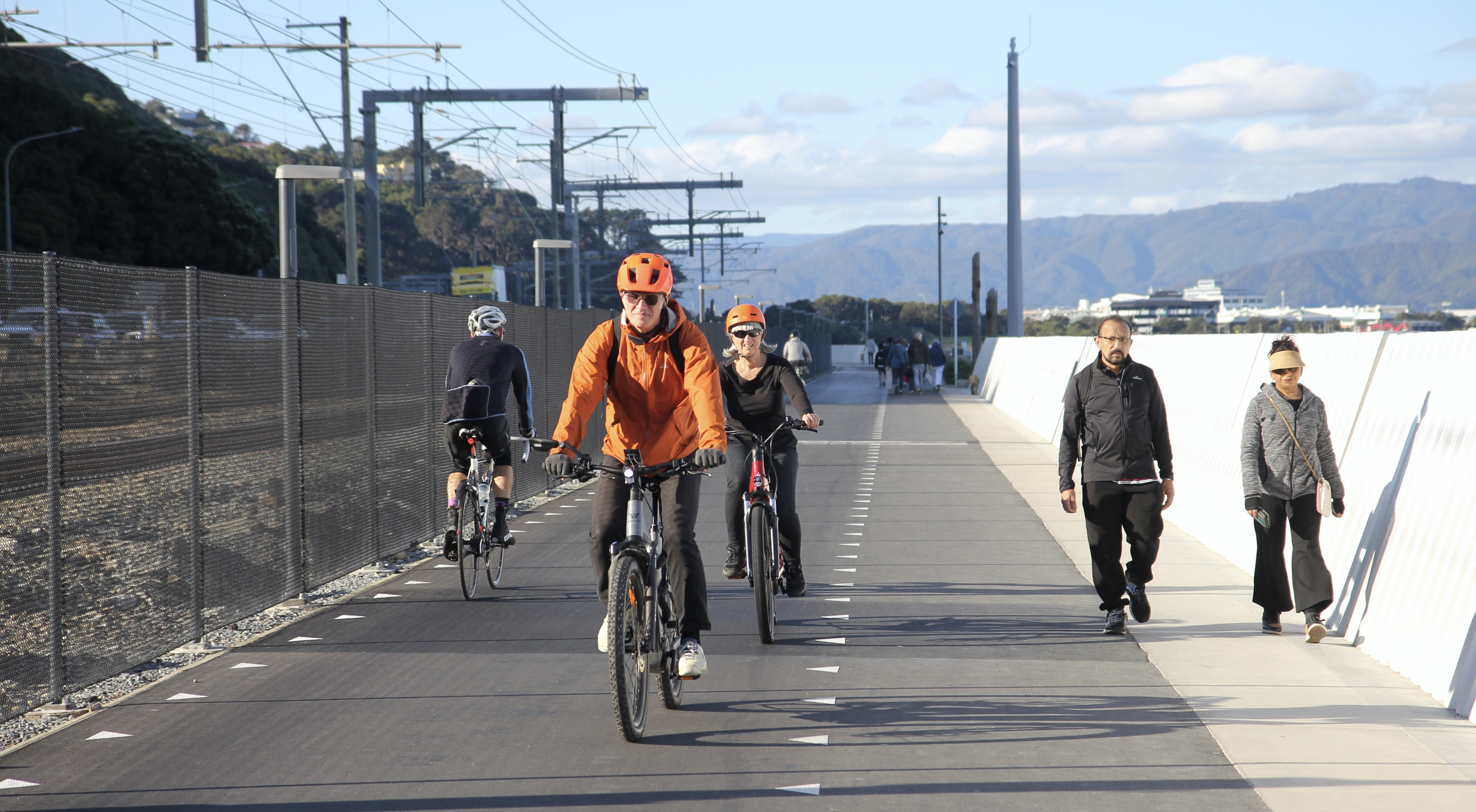
- Looking north along the Ngauranga-Petone shared path
- Length: 12 km (7.5 mi)
- Location: Hutt Valley and Wellington, New Zealand
- Use: cycling walking
- Difficulty: easy
- Sights: Wellington Harbour

Te Ara Tupua is a 12-kilometre-long (7.5 mi) safe cycling and walking path in New Zealand, between Melling, in Lower Hutt, and central Wellington. The cycleway and pathway is divided into three sections: Melling to Petone, Petone to Ngauranga, and Ngauranga to Wellington's central business district. New Zealand Transport Agency / Waka Kotahi (NZTA) led the project, with involvement from mana whenua (local Māori groups) Taranaki Whānui and Ngāti Toa, Wellington City Council, Hutt City Council and Greater Wellington Regional Council. NZTA estimates that by 2030, people will make over 2100 bike trips, 360 walking or running trips, and 300 trips on e-scooters on the path each week day.

The cycleway and pathway was opened on 16 May 2026 by Minister of Transport Chris Bishop.

== Mana whenua involvement ==
The name of the project, Te Ara Tupua (path of the ancients), derives from the legend of Whātaitai and Ngake, two mythological creatures who fought and in the process created various landforms around Wellington. Points along the cycleway commemorate former pā sites, locations, and chiefs significant to local Māori, and Māori design concepts are integrated into the design. Te Āti Awa chief Hōniana Te Puni is commemorated at Honiana Te Puni Reserve at the north end of the Petone foreshore, and his cousin Te Wharepōuri is remembered in the design of the cycleway bridge over rail tracks at Ngauranga. Two temporary buildings, known as Tāwharau Pods, were built at Honiana Te Puni Reserve. These were used as workshops for master carvers, whose carvings have been installed on the path.

== Melling to Petone ==
The section of the path between Melling and Petone is 3.5 kilometres (2.2 mi) long and about four metres (13 ft) wide, and is for cycling only. It was officially opened on 16 October 2023. The path runs alongside an existing rail route and includes two underpasses under the tracks. It links at Petone railway station to the Hutt River Trail, a cycling and walking trail along the river.

Construction was funded by NZTA using the government's Urban Cycleways Fund established in 2014, and Hutt City Council. In 2017, this section of the path was forecast to cost $17 million, but by the time construction began in 2019 the projected cost was $30 million. Poor planning and lack of investigation of the route led to delays and increased costs. $500,000 was budgeted for remediating contaminated land, but that cost ballooned to $4.5 million. Difficulties caused by geotechnical issues and the need to move underground rail and telecommunication utilities led to the final cost increasing to $65 million, making it "one of the most expensive" cycleways in New Zealand at that time.

While cyclists welcomed the path, some were apprehensive about aspects of the design. The path goes through the car park at Petone railway station and passengers leaving the station step directly on to the cycleway.

== Petone to Ngauranga ==
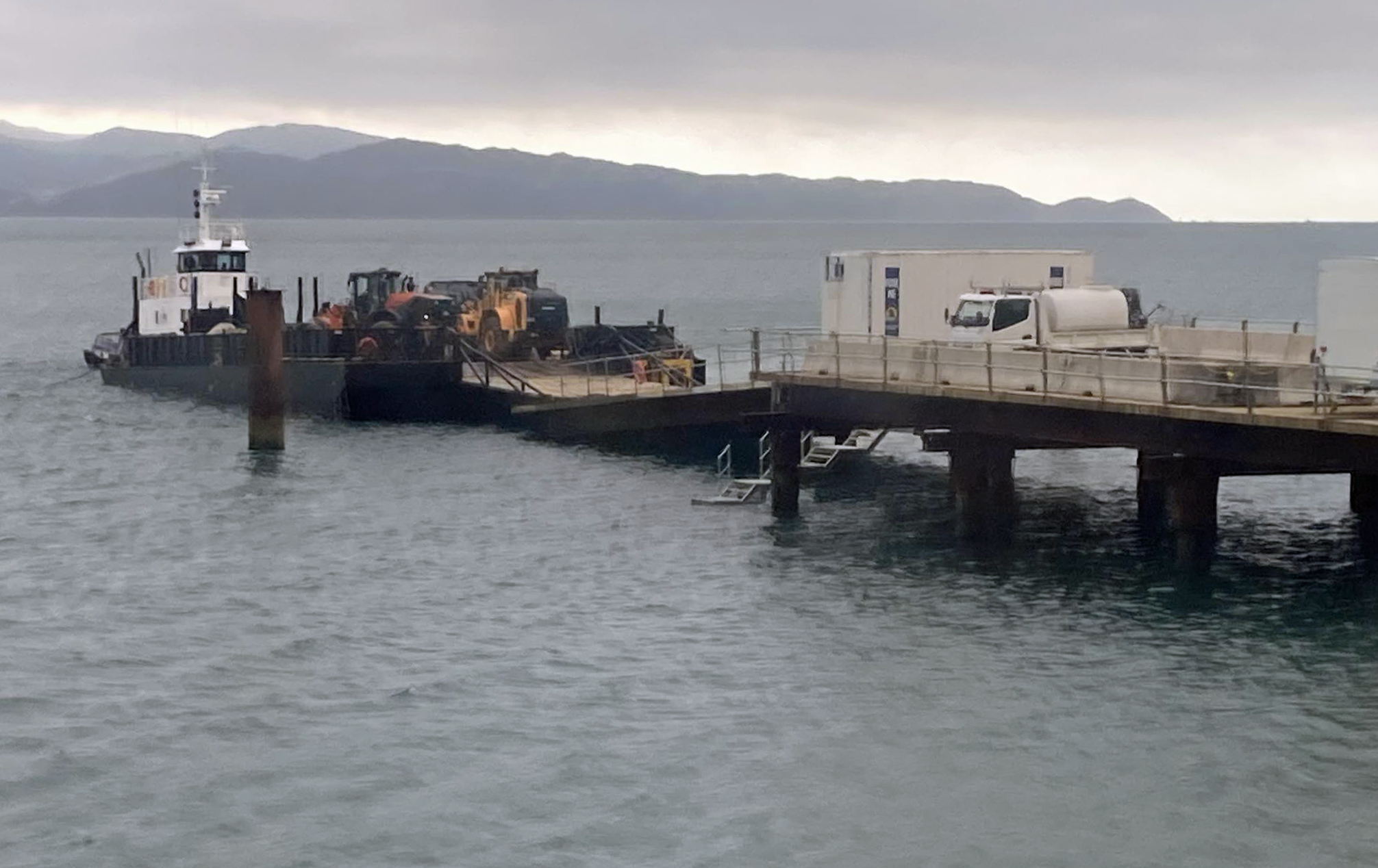
December 2023: Temporary wharf built for unloading supplies and equipment

The Petone to Ngauranga section of the path runs along the harbour front from Honiana Te Puni Reserve to the Ngauranga Interchange on the seaward side of the rail lines and State Highway 2. Preparatory works began in 2022 and the path opened on 16 May 2026. A month after its opening, NZTA reported that the path was proving popular with the public.

This section of the path is 4.5 kilometres (2.8 mi) long and five metres (16 ft) wide. NZTA states that the path will be useful in an emergency, as ambulances or fire engines will be able to travel along it if the road is blocked. As the path is further out from the steep hills along the route, it should be less affected by slips caused by heavy rain or earthquakes that might block the road, and should be able to provide continued access between Wellington and the Hutt Valley.

This section of the path was jointly funded by the Crown: ($80m), National Land Transport Fund: ($261.7m), Wellington City Council ($5m), and Greater Wellington Regional Council ($2m). In addition to the construction of the path, the project involved a new seawall to protect the adjacent road and rail corridor. As of October 2023, work on this section was expected to cost $312 million, but by opening day in May 2026, the expected cost had reached $348.7 million. After the opening day, NZTA stated that the likely final cost would come in below the $348 million budget, and that three-quarters of the cost of this section was for resilience works, and only one quarter for the pathway and bridge. The resilience works included sourcing and placing around 144,000 tonnes of rock, pouring around 2,700 cubic metres of concrete seawall and placing 6,800 interlocking concrete blocks, each of 2.6 tonnes, in the seawall. The concrete blocks, brand name 'XBlocPlus' have Māori designs pressed into them to help sea life grip on to them. Use of the XBlocPlus units reduced the need for rock by 50,000 cubic metres, "cut embodied carbon by 10%, and saved $3 million while meeting 100-year storm and seismic requirements".

The Petone end of this section of the path is marked by a large bronze sculpture called Te Kaiurungi o Te Puni (the helmsmanship of Te Puni). The sculpture represents a canoe sternpost or taurapa and includes a figure of chief Te Puni. Along the route, six spaces with planted areas jut out as ūranga or 'landings' for people to pause or use recreationally. The location and design of each landing area relates to the geology beneath it, and each is named after a Māori cultural landmark:

- Piki Wahine – a hill above Ngauranga where women and children foraged for food
- Tahataha Roa – a beach used for landing waka (canoes), which was destroyed in the 1855 Wairarapa earthquake
- Paroro-rangi Point – formerly a small Te Āti Awa settlement
- Karanga Point – Pari-karangaranga or 'Cliff of Echoes'. Māori are said to have passed along the narrow beach while listening to the voice of a female spirit up in the steep hills.
- Te Ana Bay – Te Ana-puta ('cave opening') is a sacred cave about two kilometres (1.2 mi) north of Ngauranga
- Horokiwi – formerly a settled area and the location of a track over the hills to Takapu Valley and Porirua
Petone – Ngauranga section of Te Ara Tupua

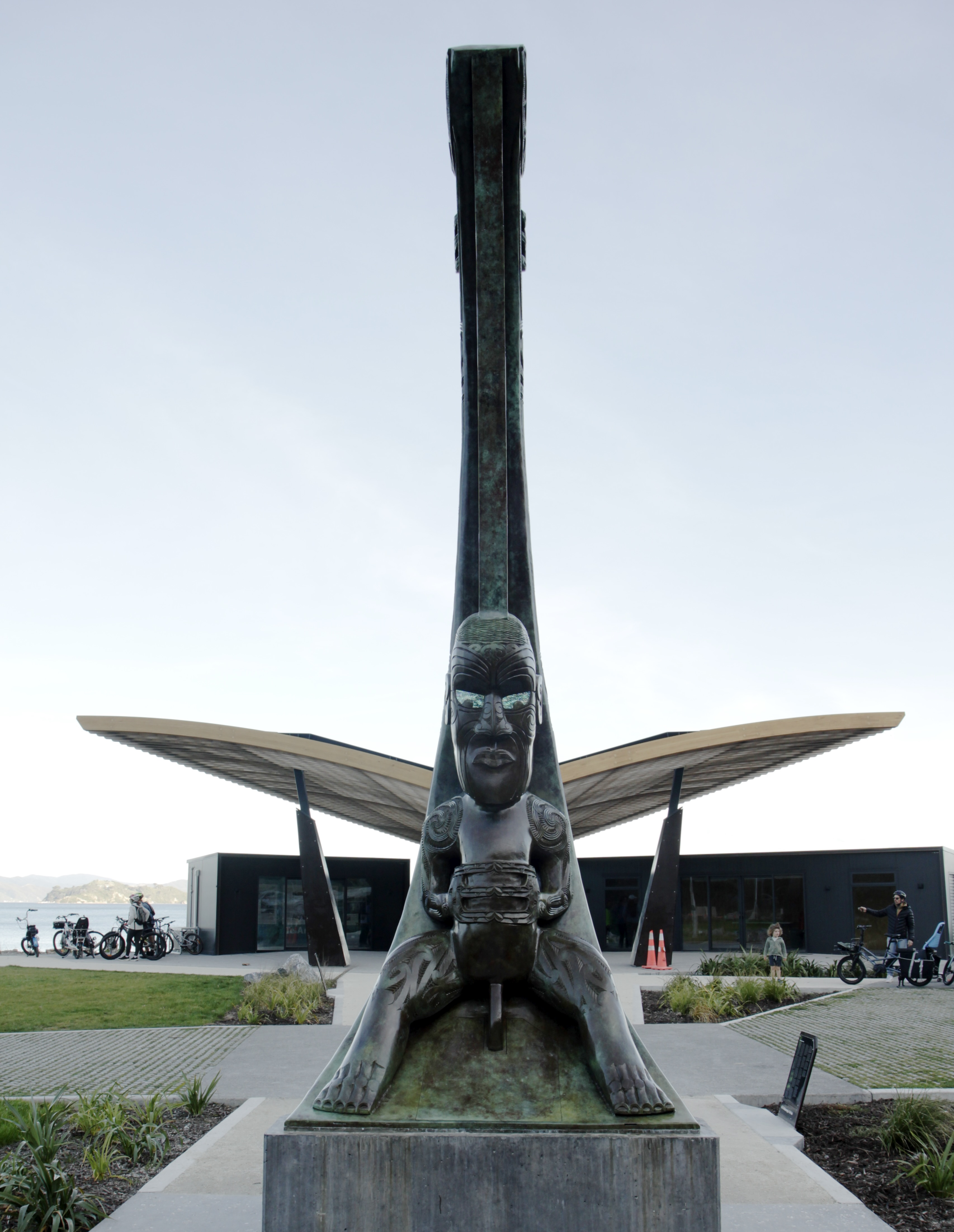
Te Kaiurungi o Te Puni, Honiana Te Puni Reserve, Petone

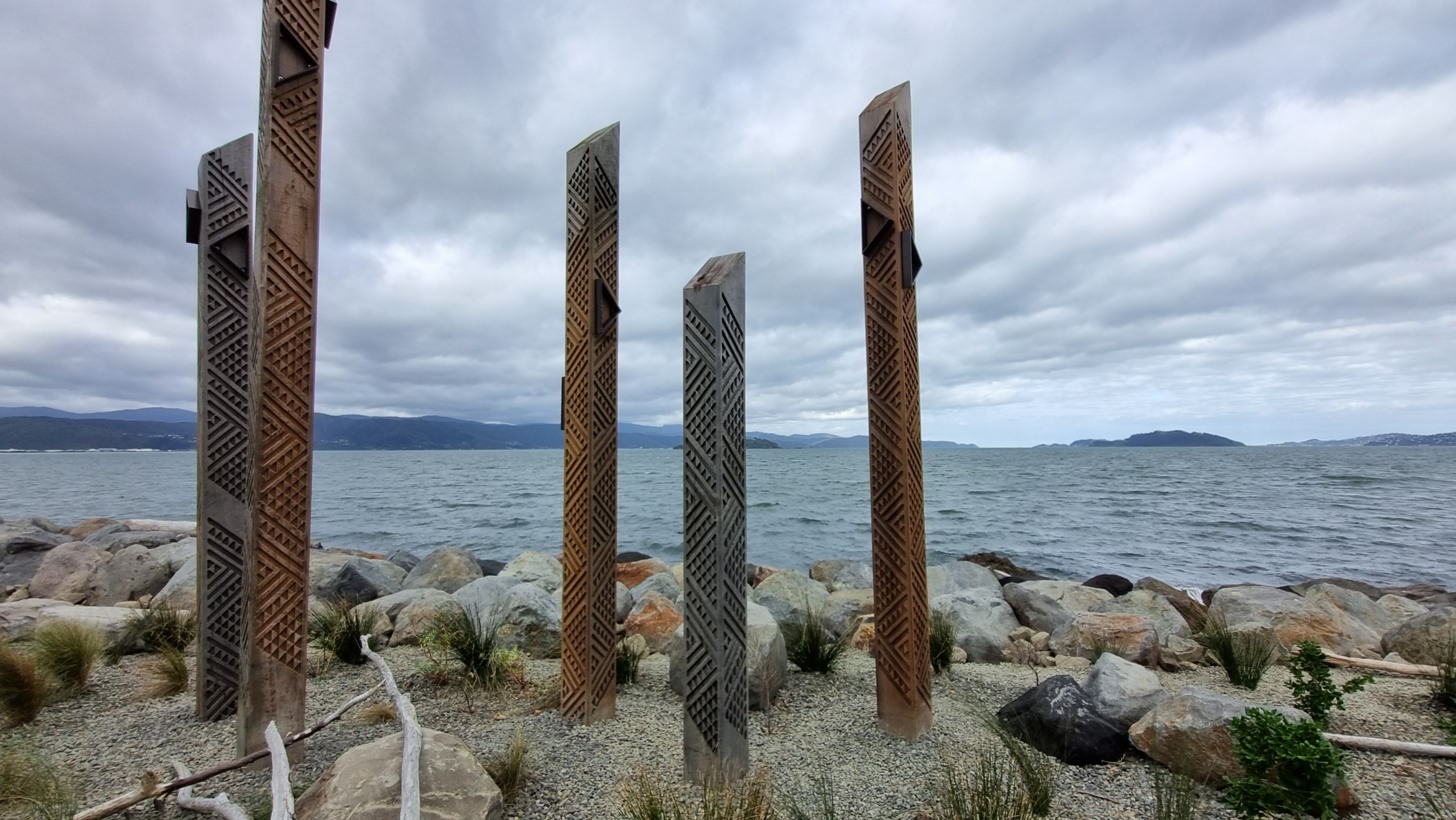
One of the 'landing places' along the shared path

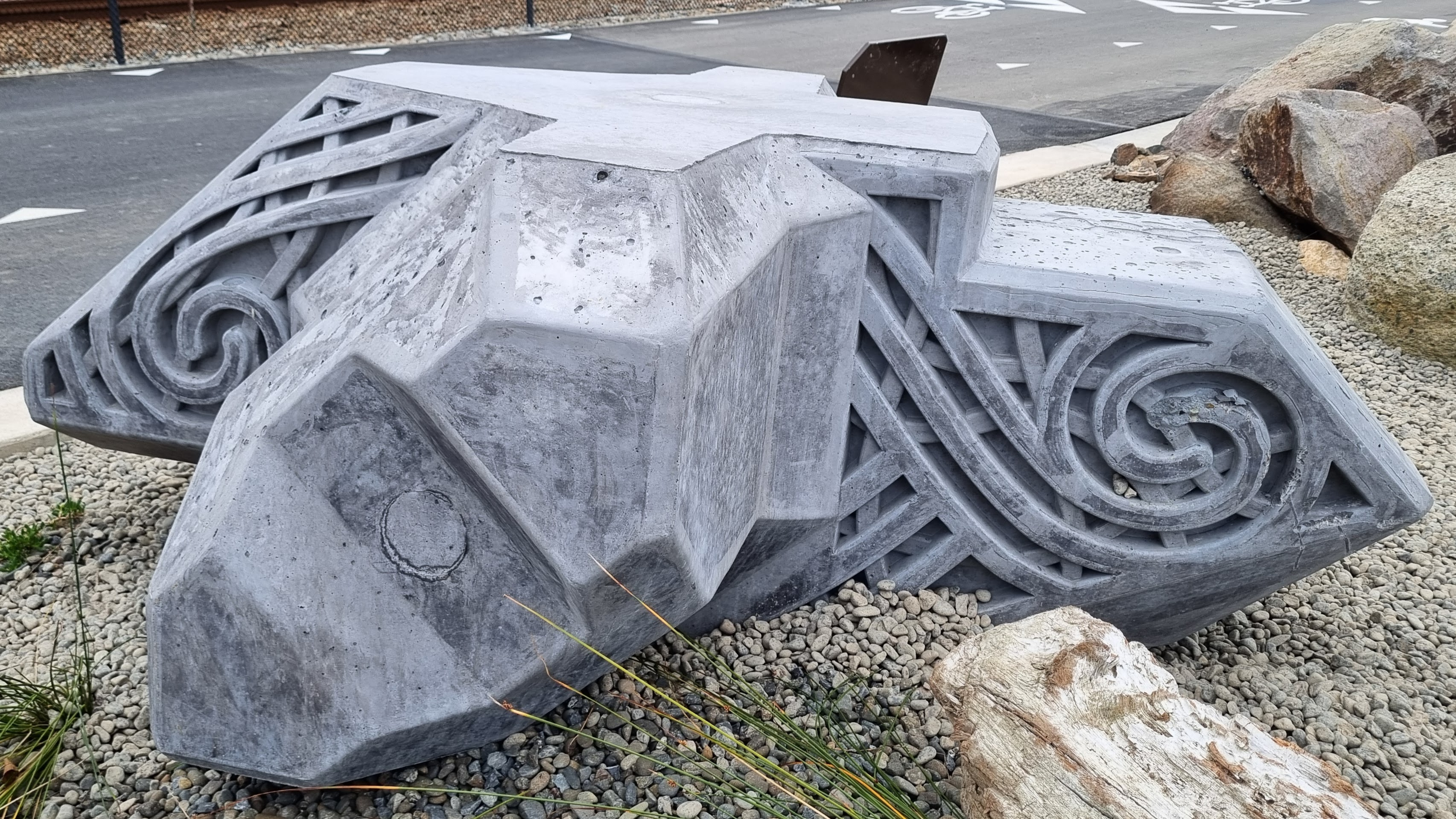
Interlocking x-shaped concrete blocks were used to create a seawall.

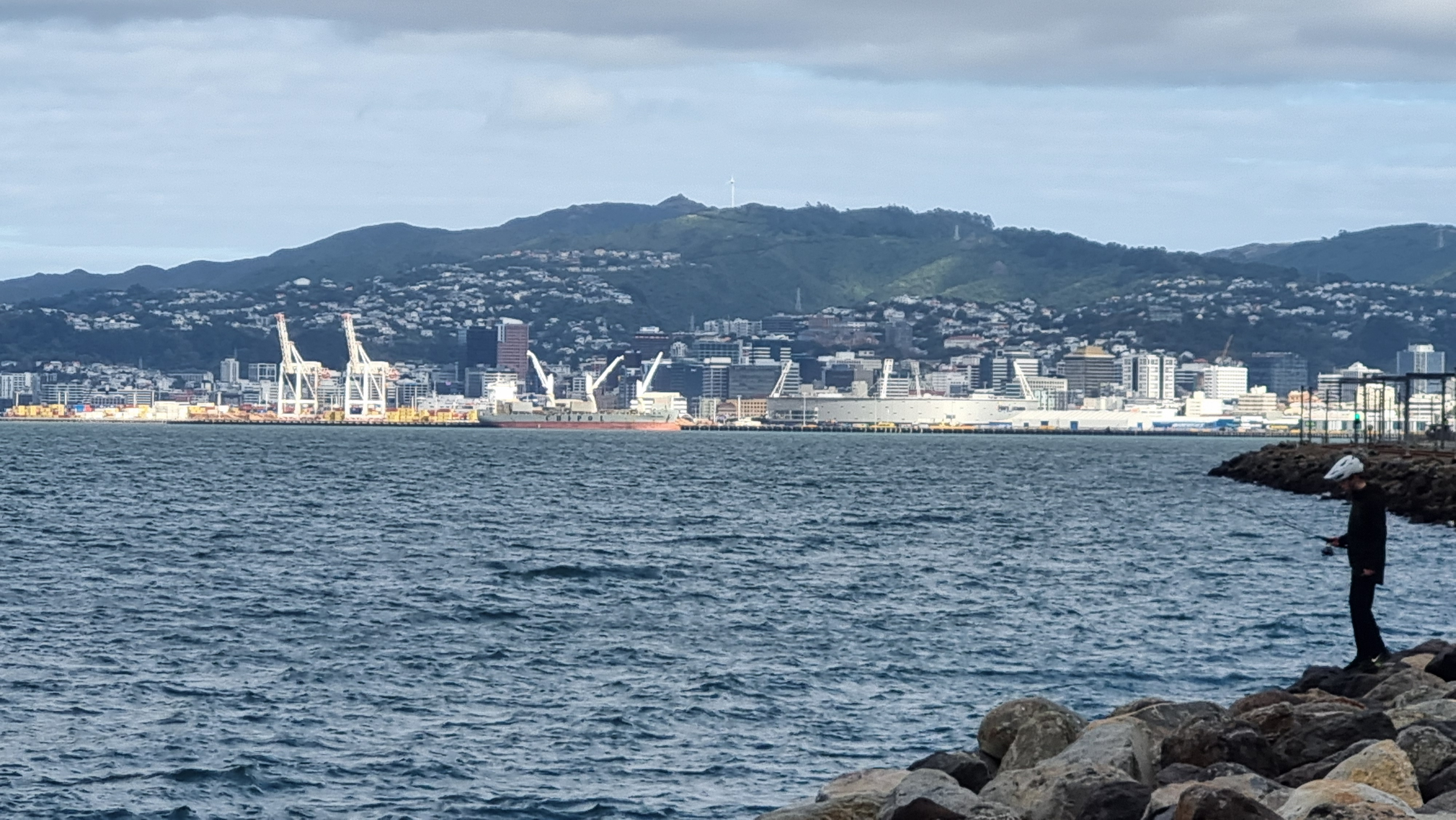
Wellington city from the shared path

=== Overbridge ===
At Ngauranga, a 211-metre-long (231 yd) bridge was built over the railway lines, wide and strong enough for emergency vehicular traffic. Four piles were driven between 15 and 20 metres deep to support the piers that hold up the bridge. The piles are larger than usual because the site is on reclaimed land near the Wellington Fault. The bridge design also needed to take into account overhead electric lines and railway lines and infrastructure. At the top of the overbridge a stylised figure of chief Te Wharepōuri stands at the front of the wall which represents the prow or tauihu of a canoe. He looks across the harbour toward Matiu / Somes Island.

Te Matarae o Wharepouri overbridge near Ngauranga

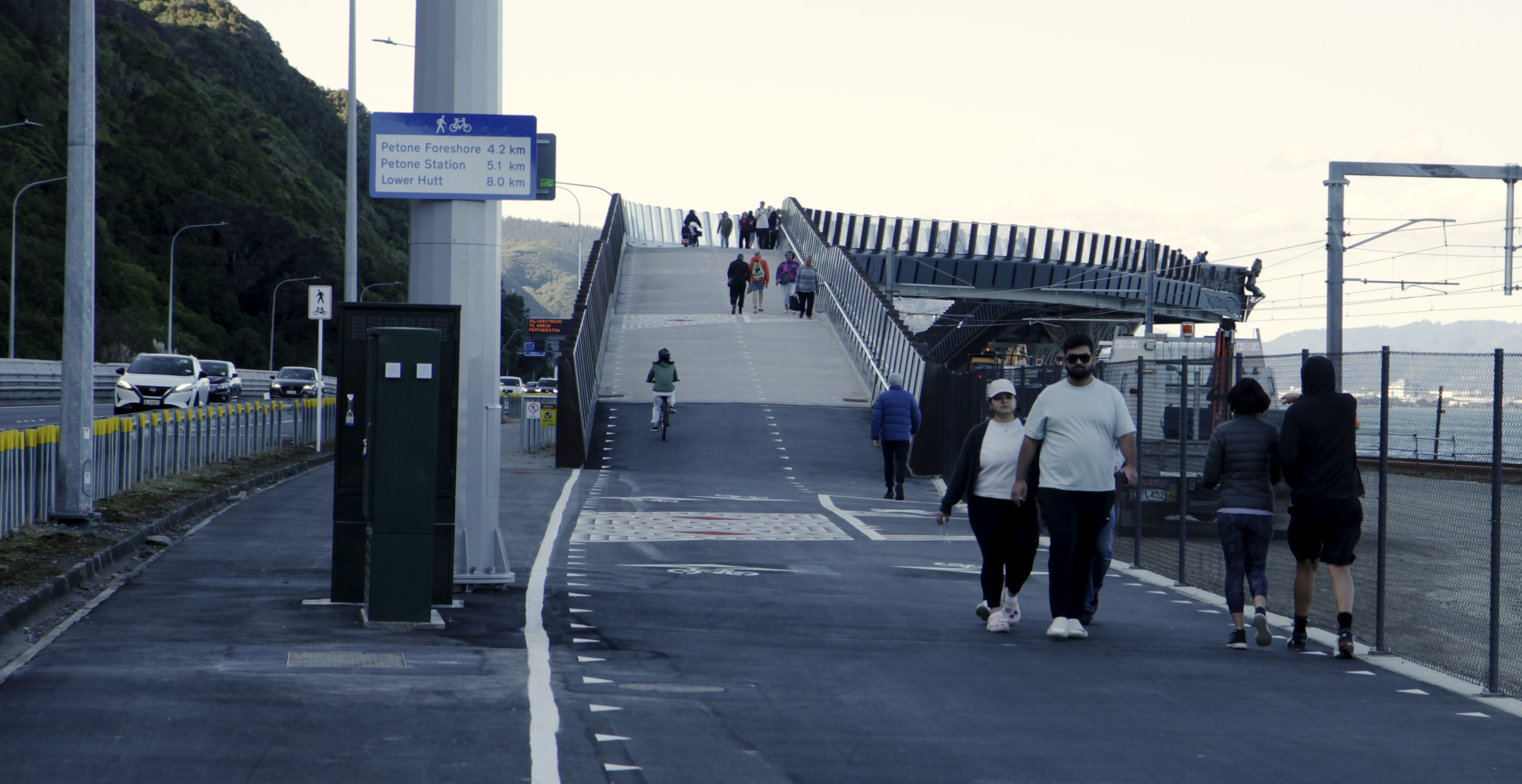
Overbridge at Ngauranga

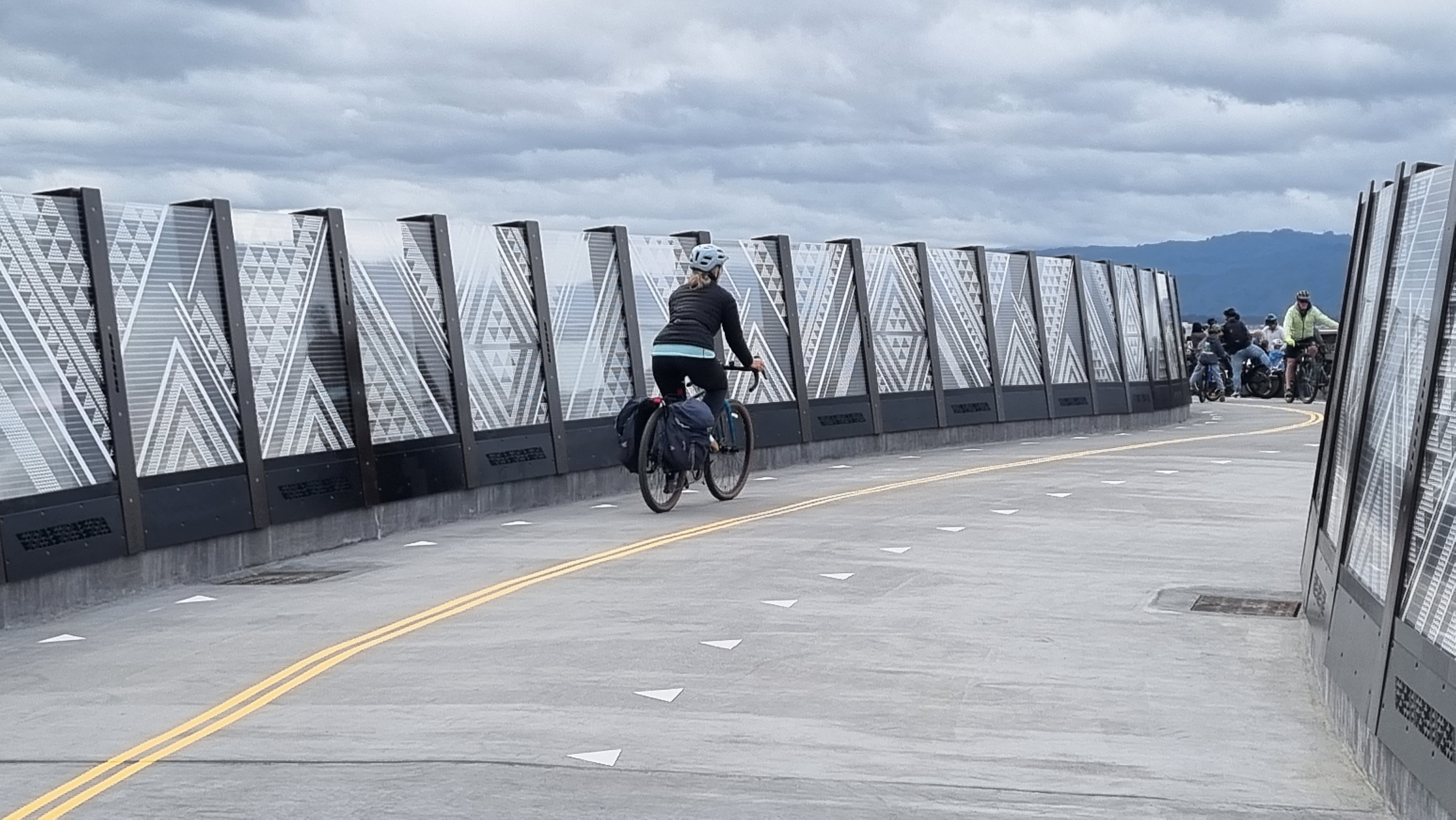
The overbridge is curved

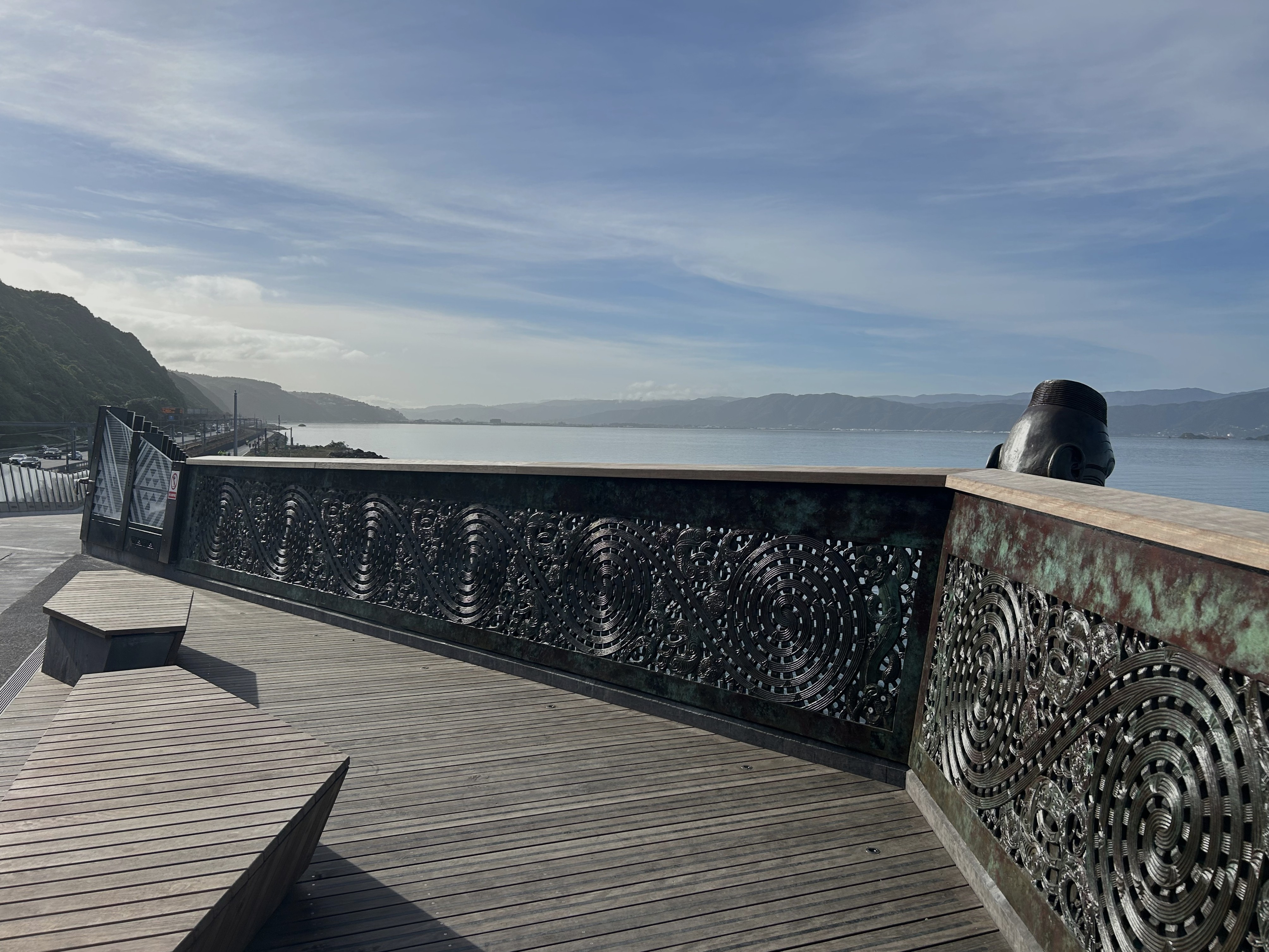
Wall at top of overbridge

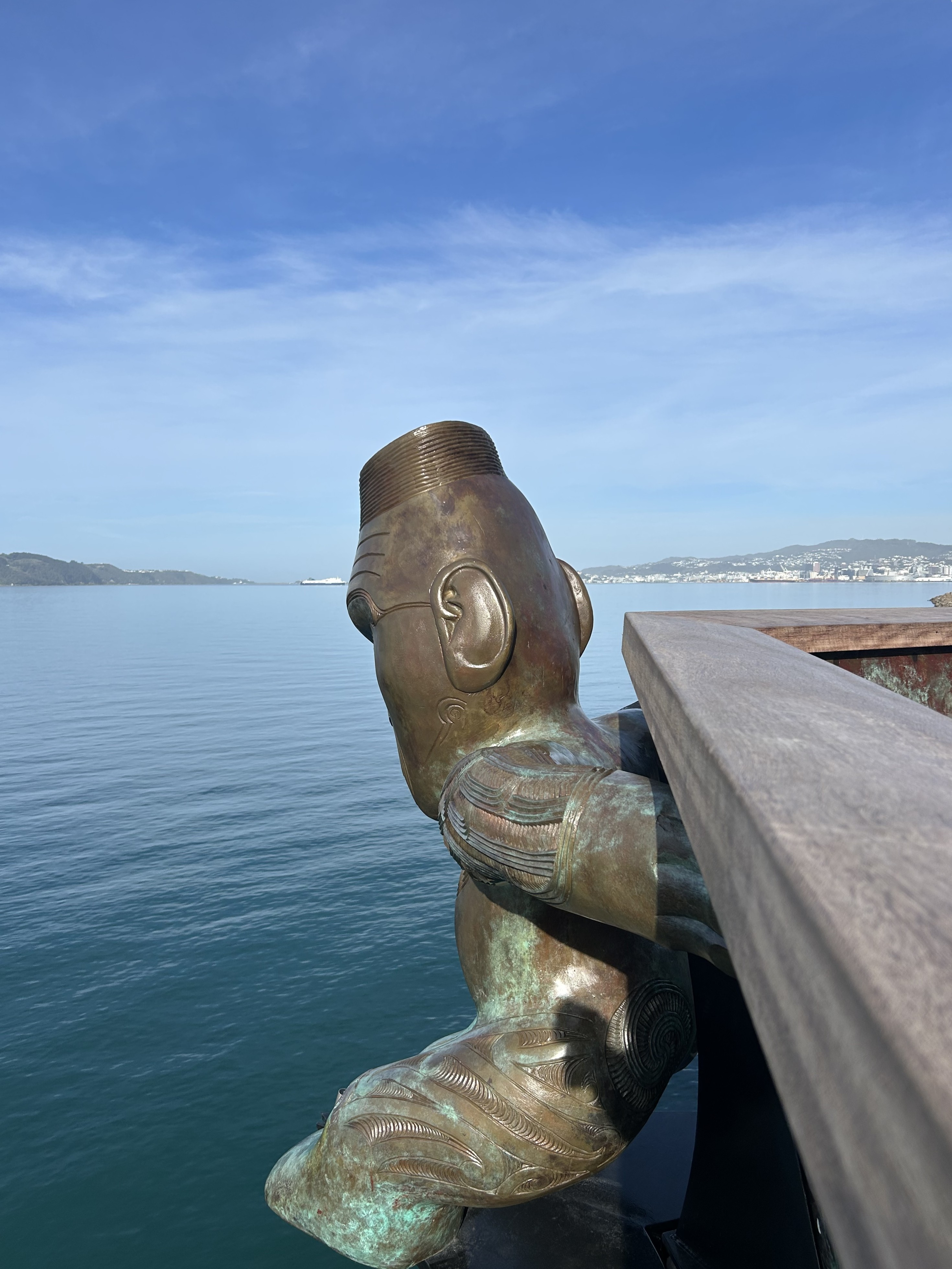
Figure of Te Wharepōuri on the overbridge

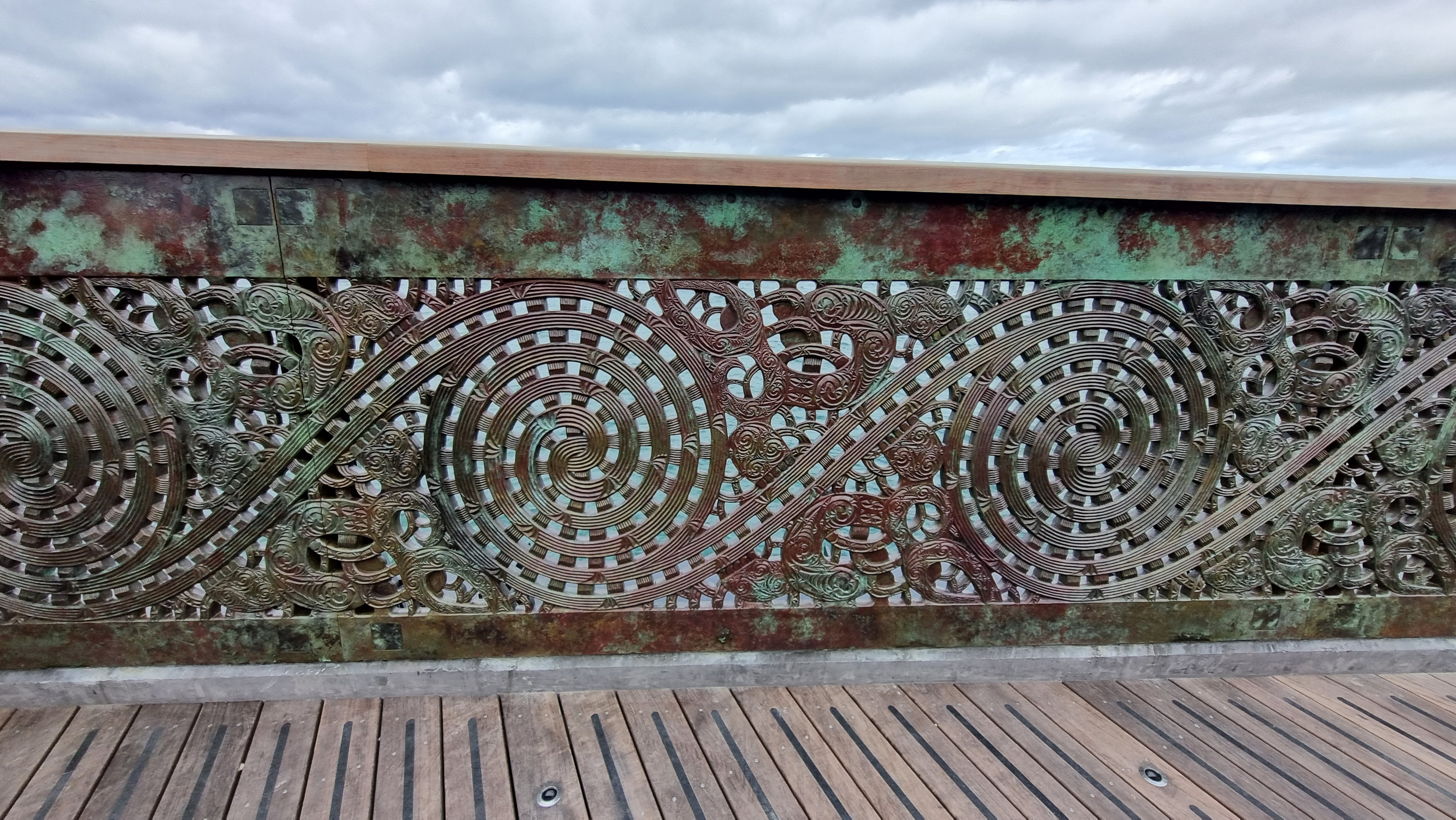
Detail of wall on top of the overbridge

=== Environmental works ===
Sloping embankments into the water, known as revetments, protect the path from wave erosion, which has previously been a problem along this part of the coastline. The revetments are built of boulders or concrete. Six segments of the path are protected with vertical seawalls instead of revetments, to protect areas of beach gravel that are special habitat areas for birds. Two piles of boulders offshore provide islets for bird life. An artificial reef was constructed from 56 pyramid-like grids of concrete, which allow water to flow through and around the pyramids, replacing the rocky shore lost during construction. The reef will provide a habitat for algae, seaweed, and animals such as crayfish, shellfish and kina. Construction began in March 2023 with creation of the islets for birds and a temporary wharf at Karanga Point for unloading supplies. The wharf was removed in 2024. Construction of the reef was completed in June 2024. Within seven months, it had been colonised by tube worms, native kelps, sea-lettuce and triplefin fish.

Twenty-seven culverts were installed along the path. Four of these are for streams: Waihinahina Stream that flows down from Horokiwi Quarry, Gilberd Bush Stream from Gilberd Bush in Newlands, and two unnamed, intermittent streams that flow during heavy rain. Other culverts handle runoff from the road and railway.

In June 2026, the alliance responsible for the Petone to Ngauranga section of Te Ara Tupua received an Excellence Award in Environmental Outcomes from the Infrastructure Sustainability Council for its commitment to the environment in "[transforming] coastal infrastructure into active environmental restoration".

Petone – Ngauranga environmental works

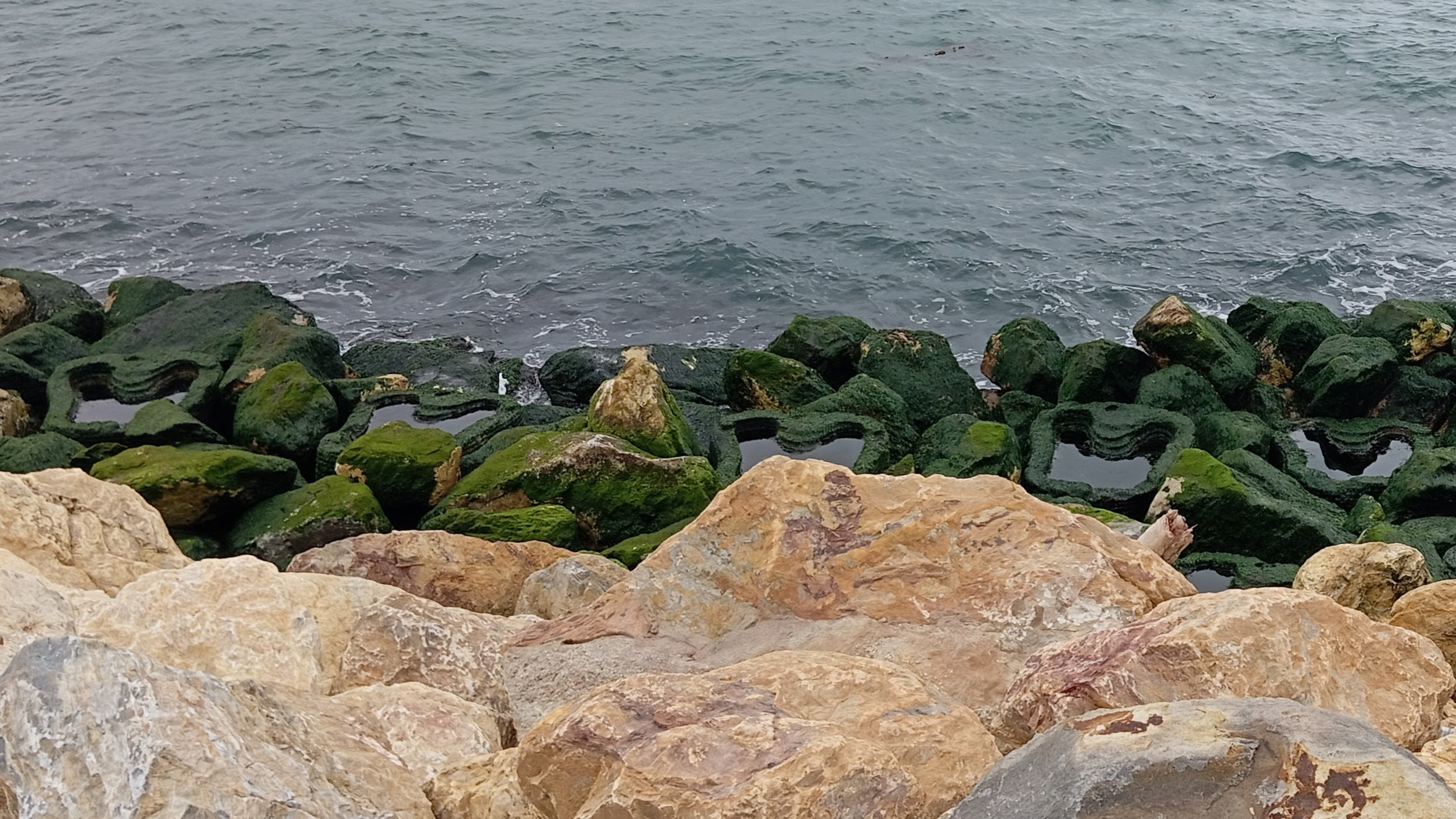
Artificial tidal pools for wildlife

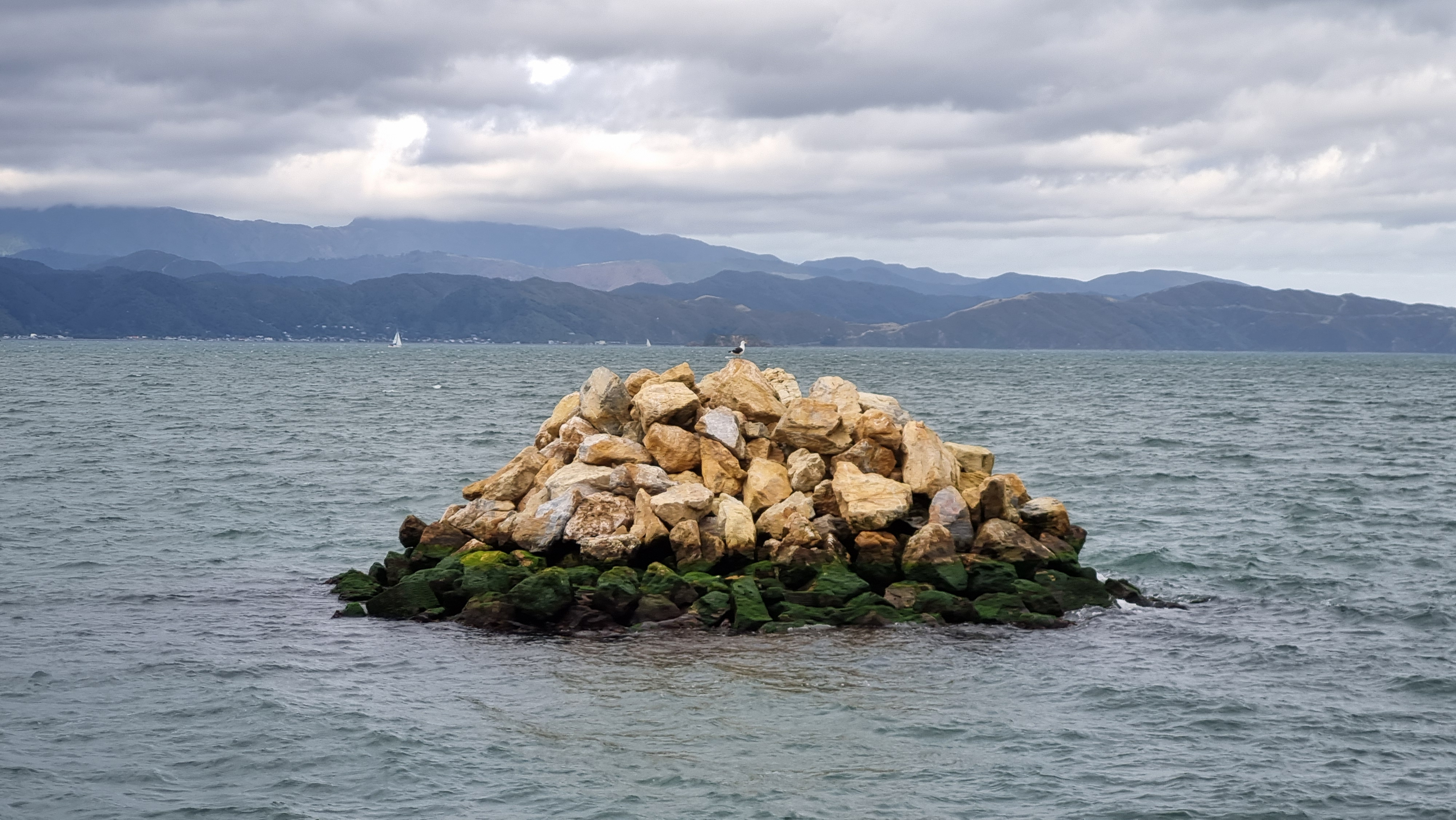
Artificial islet for birdlife

== Ngauranga to Wellington CBD ==
The Ngauranga to central Wellington section of Te Ara Tupua runs from the Ngauranga Interchange, along Hutt Road and Thorndon Quay to Bunny Street near Wellington railway station. Parts of the Hutt Road have had upgraded walking and cycling paths built, and other changes were planned by Let's Get Wellington Moving (LGWM), an organisation controlled by the Greater Wellington Regional Council, Wellington City Council and NZTA. Changes made to Thorndon Quay have proved controversial. In 2021, the number of car parks was reduced by 50%, which led local businesses to complain that the plan was not well thought out and that they were losing customers. Further changes to car parking, installation of cycle lanes, bus priority lanes, and more pedestrian crossings were planned for the final design, with construction beginning late in 2023. In June 2023, LGWM advised Wellington City Council that the cost of the works on Thorndon Quay had increased from $77m in February 2022 to $94m. The increase was due to more detailed designs, scope change and inflation. The section is complete as of July 2025.

NZTA funded 51% of the project, with the remainder of about $46m contributed by Wellington City Council.

== See also ==
- Cycling in Wellington
- Te Aka Ōtākou, a similar cycleway in Dunedin, New Zealand
