= George Tole =

New Zealand architect (1897–1972)

George Edmund Tole
- Born: 18 September 1897; Auckland, New Zealand
- Died: 27 August 1972 (aged 74); Auckland, New Zealand
- Occupation: Architect
- Buildings: St Michael's Catholic Church, Auckland (1933)

George Tole (18 September 1897 – 27 August 1972) was a New Zealand architect, who was active in Auckland from the 1920s to 1940s. He was the designer of a number of heritage-listed buildings, including St Michael's Catholic Church.

== Early life ==
George Edmund Tole was born on 18 September 1897 in Auckland, New Zealand, one of eight of children of Danial Austin Tole, a Commissioner for Crown Lands, and his wife, Tasmania-born Mary Smales. He was educated at King's College in Auckland and once his education was completed, studied architecture at Abbott & Arnold, a practice in Auckland. From December 1917, he worked for the architect Daniel Patterson, and a year later became an associate in the New Zealand Institute of Architects.

== Professional practice ==
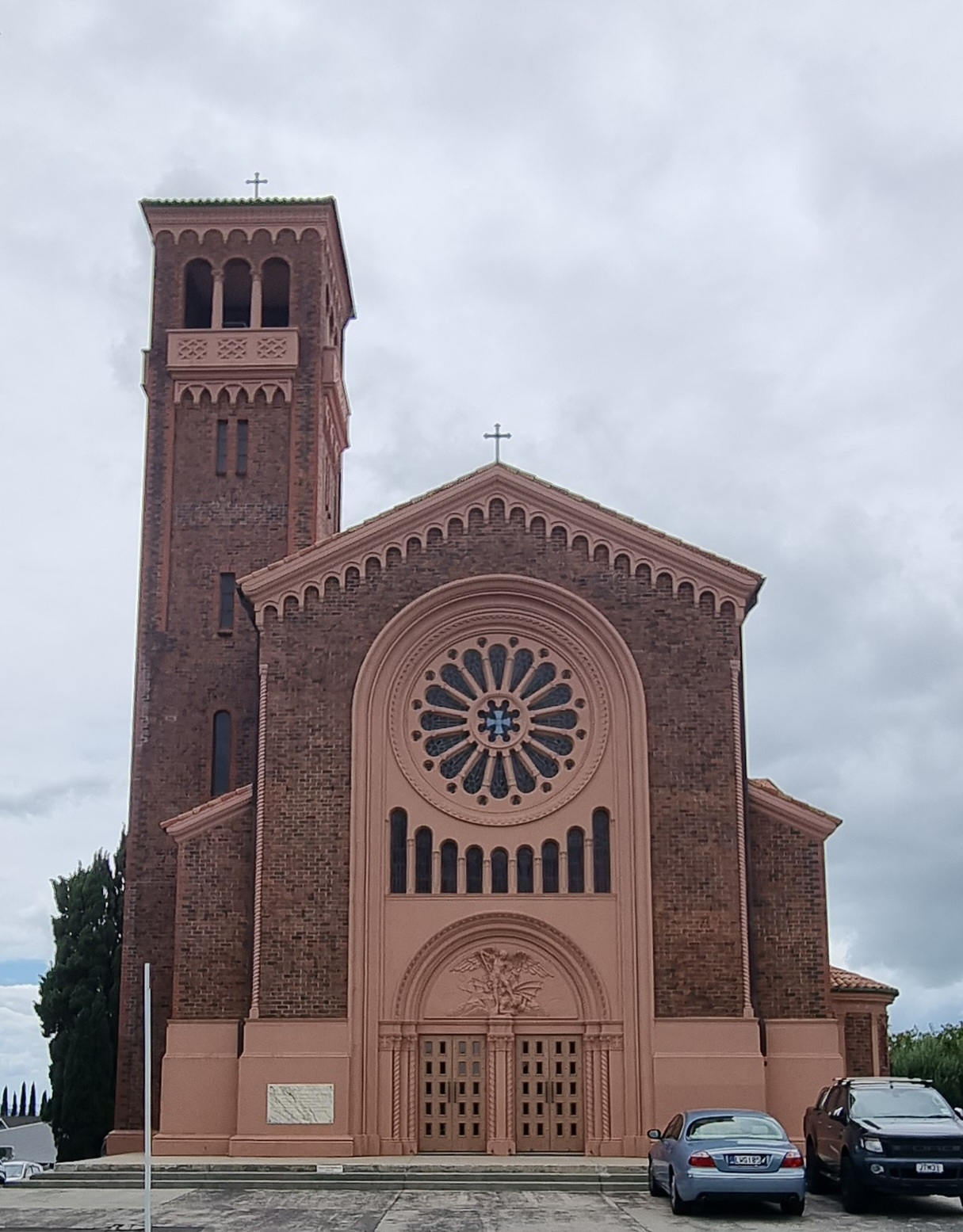
Tole & Massey's St Michael's Catholic Church in Remuera

Tole appears to have commenced work as a sole practitioner in early 1925, placing a tender for a residential dwelling in the Auckland suburb of Remuera. By 1928 he was in partnership with another Auckland-based architect, Horace Massey. One of the houses produced by the partnership, known as Tole & Massey, was Heard House in Parnell, a residence that was heritage listed by Historic Places Trust in 1981. Another design was the Star of the Sea Convent Block, an orphanage completed in 1931 for the Sisters of Mercy, in Manukau, but this differed from many other ecclesiastical buildings of the time as it was executed in a Romanesque style. A prominent commission was St Michael's Catholic Church in Remuera, the construction of which commenced in 1932. Opened the following year, it won the New Zealand Institute of Architect's Gold Medal. The building was heritage listed in 1985. By 1935, Tole's partnership with Massey had ended.

Beginning in 1933, Tole often was called upon by the company Amalgamated Theatres to work on converting existing buildings into picture theatres. He was responsible for the State Theatre in Onehunga. The Roxy, in the Everybody's Building on Queen Street, was completed in June 1935, was one of his designs that was heritage listed in 1987. He was the designer of a memorial plinth unveiled at Totara Point near Kohukohu on 13 January 1938, recognising the centenary of the first Catholic Mass in New Zealand by Bishop Jean-Baptiste Pompallier. The following year the construction of Tole's design for a Dominican Convent in Northcote was completed.

== Later life ==
Separated from his wife, who Tole had married in 1930, he raised two daughters as a solo father. He had taken legal proceedings in Sydney in Australia to prevent his wife, who had stopped there on her way to England, from taking one of his daughters, Jenifer with her. In 1950 he designed the Trevor Moss Davis Memorial Fountain, which was installed at the reserve in Mission Bay in memory of an Auckland businessman.

In his later years, Tole lived with his extended family in Remuera where he died on 27 August 1972. A memorial mass was subsequently held for him at St Michael's Catholic Church. His daughter Jenifer became a well-known librarian and translator of Māori-language documents.
