= Cintra Flats =

Coordinates: 36°51′25″S 174°45′59″E

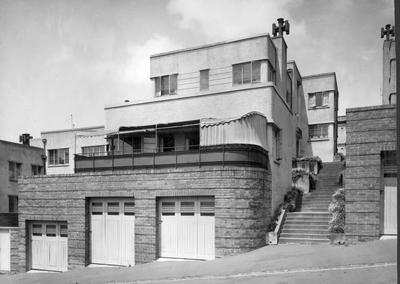
- Flats circa 1940

General information
- Status: Completed
- Type: Flats
- Architectural style: Modernist
- Location: 7–13 Whitaker Place, Grafton, Auckland, New Zealand
- Year built: 1935-1936

Design and construction
- Architect: Horace Massey
- Awards: NZIA Gold Award Winner 1937

Heritage New Zealand – Category 2
- Official name: Cintra Flats, Auckland
- Designated: 26 November 1981
- Reference no.: 564

The Cintra Flats are a block of modernist flats in central Auckland designed by New Zealand architect Horace Massey. Built between 1935 and 1936 by the Fletcher Construction Company Ltd, the flats won Massey the 1937 NZIA gold award for their innovative design. They are listed by Heritage New Zealand as a Category 2 Historic Place.

== Cintra property ==
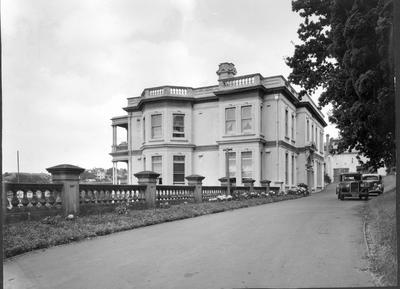
Cintra homestead circa 1940

The Cintra homestead property was the residence of Sir Arthur Myers, the Mayor of Auckland between 1905 and 1909. He commissioned the construction of the main house for his wife upon their marriage, and the property would go on become a centre for entertainment in the city. The property consisted of the main house containing 20 rooms, a smaller brick house containing 4 rooms, and five and a half hectares of land.

The property was put up for sale in 1923 but did not reach a suitable price. By the late 1920s, the Cintra homestead was the "only remaining large block of land in the city area" under private ownership, and was purchased by the Fletcher Trust and Investment Company in 1928. The main house was converted into 5 flats in 1931.

== Planning and groundwork ==
The Fletcher Construction Company Ltd developed and built the Cintra flats. The main house of the Cintra homestead was not demolished in the development. The property of 82 Symonds Street was purchased from Dr. Coldicutt in order to widen Whitaker Place, and would become the entrance to the flats. The roadwork contract was won by H. Bray & Company Limited, and a new road was created adjoining Whitaker Place. As of May 1935 the estimated value of each flat was £1000, with the blocks valued at £70,000. The total projected cost including groundwork and maintenance of the whole property was £100,000.

== Design and construction ==
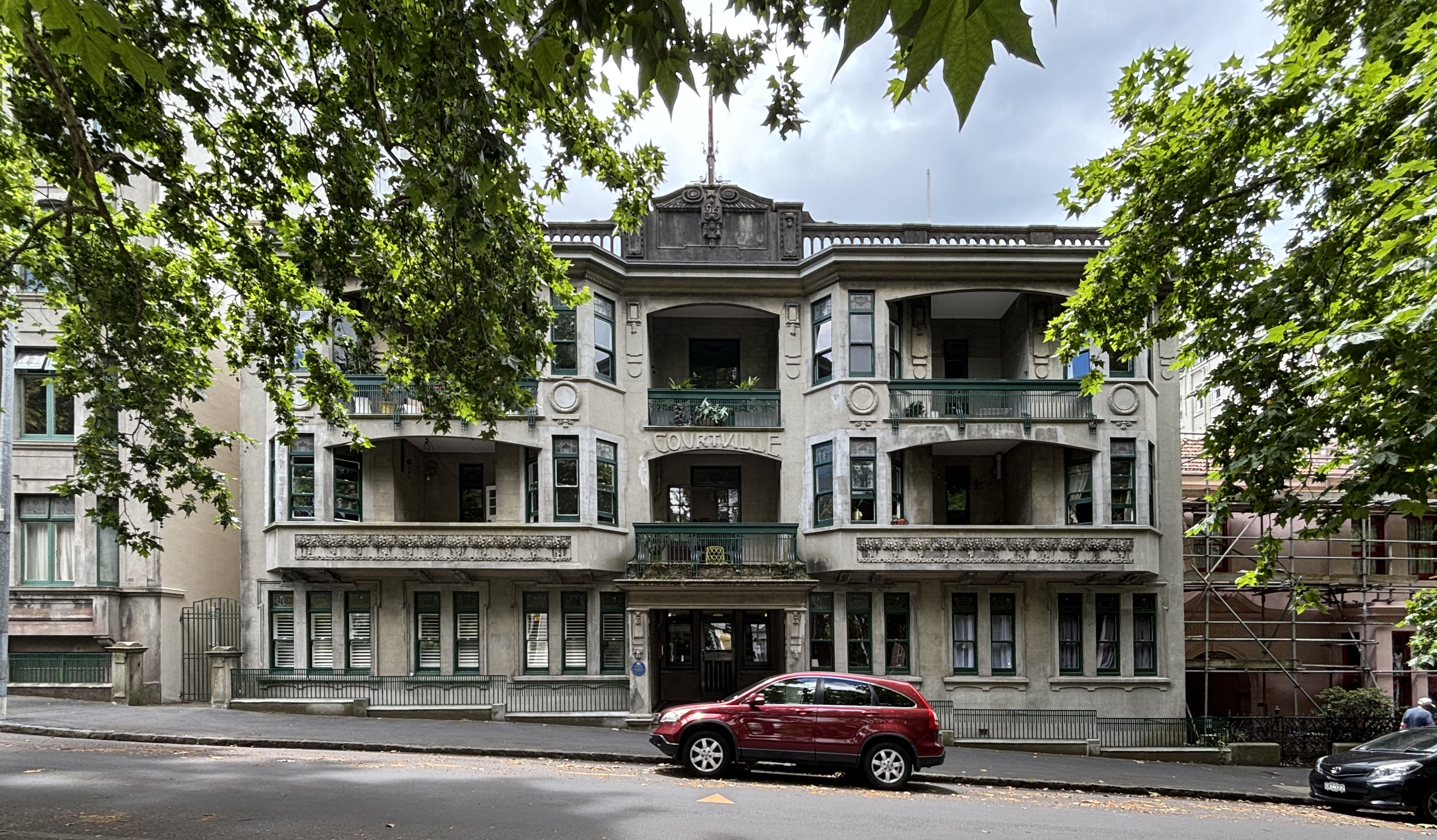
Middle Courtville as of January 2026

Cintra was novel and notable, but not the first iteration of apartment living in Auckland. Apartments had been associated with the crowded and squalid 'Old World' tenement buildings, but this conception shifted in early 20th century New Zealand. The first inner city block of self-contained flats in the country was constructed in 1914, in the form of the luxury European-style Courtville Flats designed by Arthur Sinclair O'Connor and built by the Fletcher Construction Company.

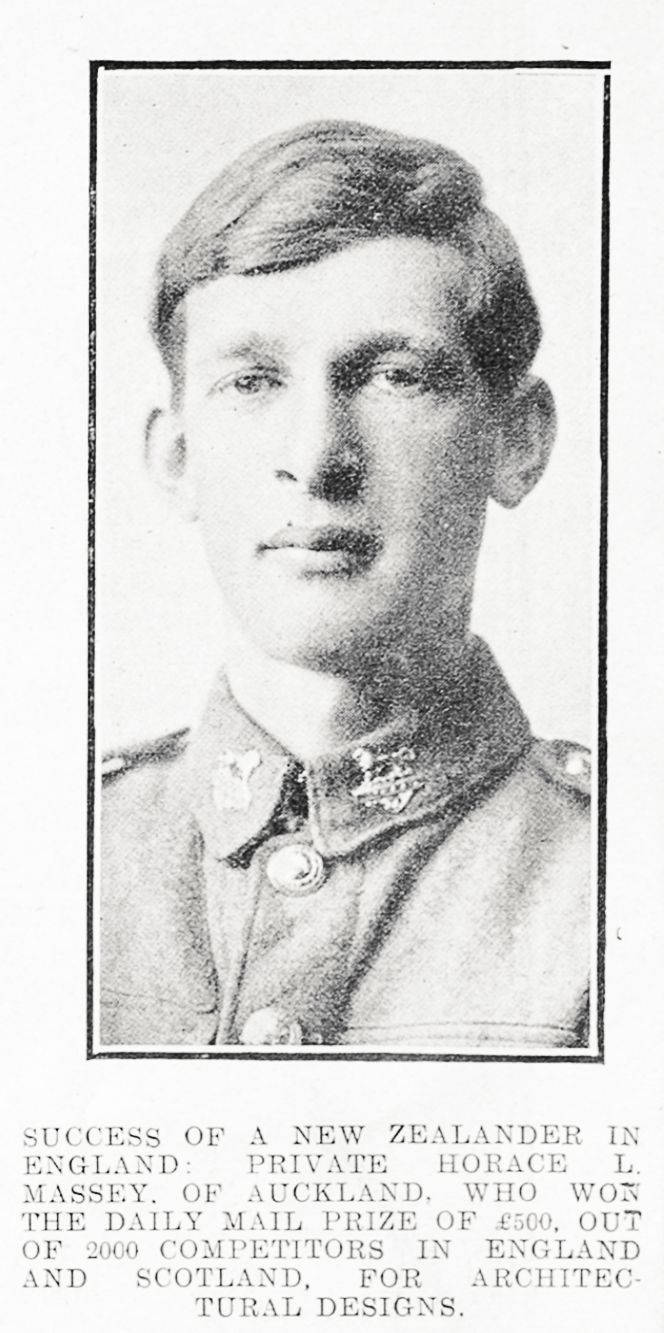
Horace Massey circa 1919

Cintra was designed and built during New Zealand's second wave of early apartment development in the interwar years. These flats were "upmarket statements of progress and urban sophistication"; stylish, functional and modern. The Cintra Flats were designed by Horace Lovell Massey, a progressive Auckland architect trained in Britain and New Zealand. He planned 75 flats for the projected development of 15 blocks, but only three blocks eventuated. The New Zealand architectural climate had shifted by the 1930s and modernism came into fashion. The Cintra Flats were "modern without being revolutionary". They departed from the style of older inner city apartments in Auckland, and were designed to be "inexpensive and comfortable", their beauty rendered through simplicity and lack of "superficial pretentiousness." The flats of Cintra were practical homes for modern living, thanks to Massey's concise interior planning. In 1935 Massey also designed Cintra's 'sister' flats, the Gloucester Court Flats in Ponsonby built between 1935 and 1936. Both blocks of flats were modern and focused on functionality, but the Cintra Flats were notably more radical in design.

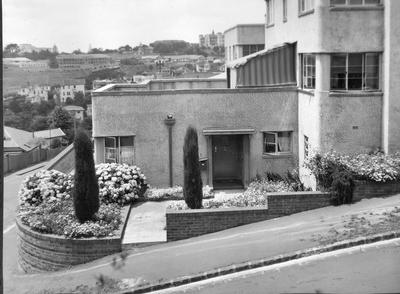
View of flats with Auckland Domain in the background, circa 1940

=== Features ===
The blocks of flats were built with reinforced concrete, and externally faced with plastered cavity brick. The roof tile, concrete shingle and cement were all supplied by Winstone Ltd. Modern features included the streamlined curved corners, textured plaster and horizontal banding wrapping around the blocks. Vertical elements of downpipes, stairwells and chimneys contrasted the horizontal form. Large windows without overhanging eaves made rooms bright, and all apartments had a view at the time of construction, of the harbour or Grafton Gully and the Domain.

Inside the flats, walls were textured with stucco plaster. Each flat had two bedrooms, a living room, dining room, bathroom and a kitchen, with short hallways connecting the rooms. The living rooms had almost an entire wall of windows to let the sun in, following the health trend of sunbathing in 1930s New Zealand. Bathrooms were "glamorous" with stylish pedestal basins and recessed shelving creating a modern altar-like space. Massey designed the kitchens as rooms to be seen instead of hidden away, as they had been in the past when domestic servants were common in New Zealand homes. Alongside the "usual equipment", modern labour saving devices were installed, including recessed refrigerators (not prevalent in homes until after WW2), fitted stovetop smoke extractors, electric stoves and a space under the sink for rubbish with an outside vent, and a door that the "custodian of the estate" would use to empty the receptacle into the garbage tin. Other modern conveniences included built in ironing boards and electric washing machines, water heaters, radiators, toasters, kettles, and wireless radios.

=== Construction ===
Construction began in late 1935 after the property had been roaded and subdivided into seventeen sections. Managing director of the Fletcher Construction Company, Sir James Fletcher, stated that the first block would contain 5 flats. Three were to be ground level, and two made up the second storey.

In June 1936, a special cable was laid by Auckland Electric-Power Board from Grafton Road to Grafton Gully to Cintra, in order to supply the flats with alternating current to allow for the extra power they demanded. The area surrounding the flats was classified as one of the "direct current districts" of Auckland, and Cintra required more power than could be supplied by the older direct current system. The flats would require power for over 100 electric stoves and refrigerators, as well as lighting and heating. The Power Board was planning to completely switch the district from direct current to alternating current, so the expense of laying the new cable was felt to be "justified." The special cable was tapped to an existing underground cable in Grafton Road and was carried underground across Grafton Gully.

=== Second and third blocks ===
Out of the 15 blocks of flats planned, only 3 were executed. The first block, at the westernmost position on the corner of Cintra Place, was completed in 1936. The second block to be completed was the easternmost, situated on the corner of Whitaker Place. The third was the central block, completed a short time after the second was built.

== Awards and status ==
The Cintra Flats are a notable piece of Auckland architecture. Horace Massey won the New Zealand Institute of Architects Gold Award in 1937 for his design of the Cintra Flats. The NZIA made a selection from designs submitted each year, and sent them on to the Royal Institute of British Architects' jury of awards for final selection. The medal is the highest honour in New Zealand architecture, and Cintra was the first modernist building in Auckland to be awarded the medal.

The flats were identified as significant and listed by Heritage New Zealand as a Category 2 Historic Place in 1981. Category 2 status indicates the historic place has "historical or cultural significance or value", meeting the requirements for entry to the New Zealand Heritage List. The Cintra Flats remain significant under legislation as of 2026.

=== Contemporary usage and legacy ===
As of 2026 the flats are used for private living and are not accessible to the public. Cintra is the best known of the modernist inner city block of apartments in New Zealand.

== Gallery ==
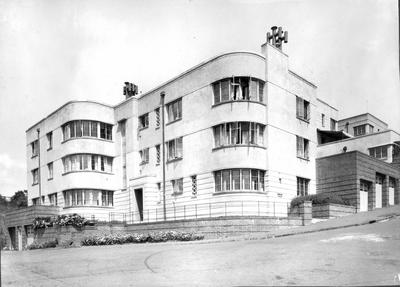
c. 1940

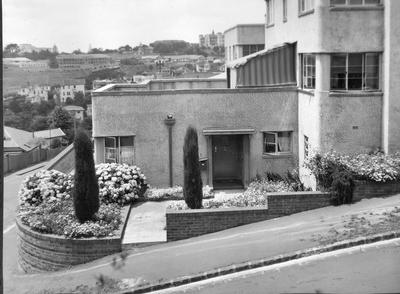
c. 1940

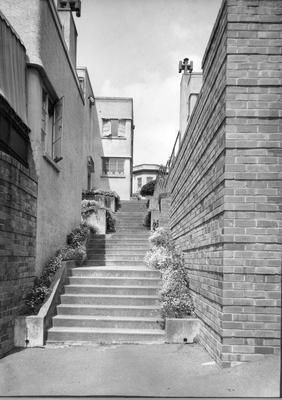
c. 1940

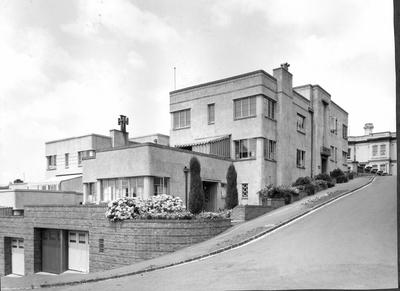
c. 1940

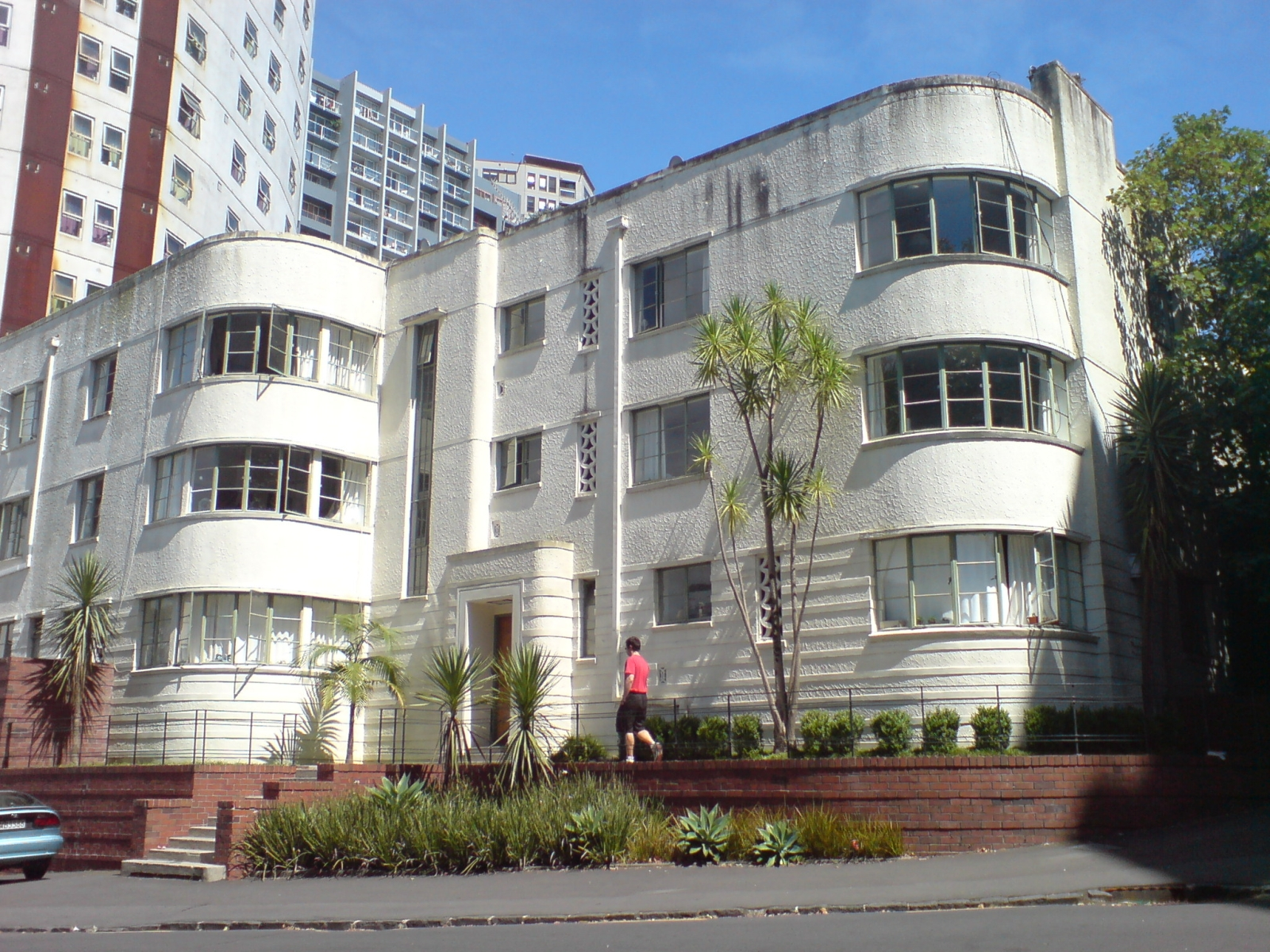
2011

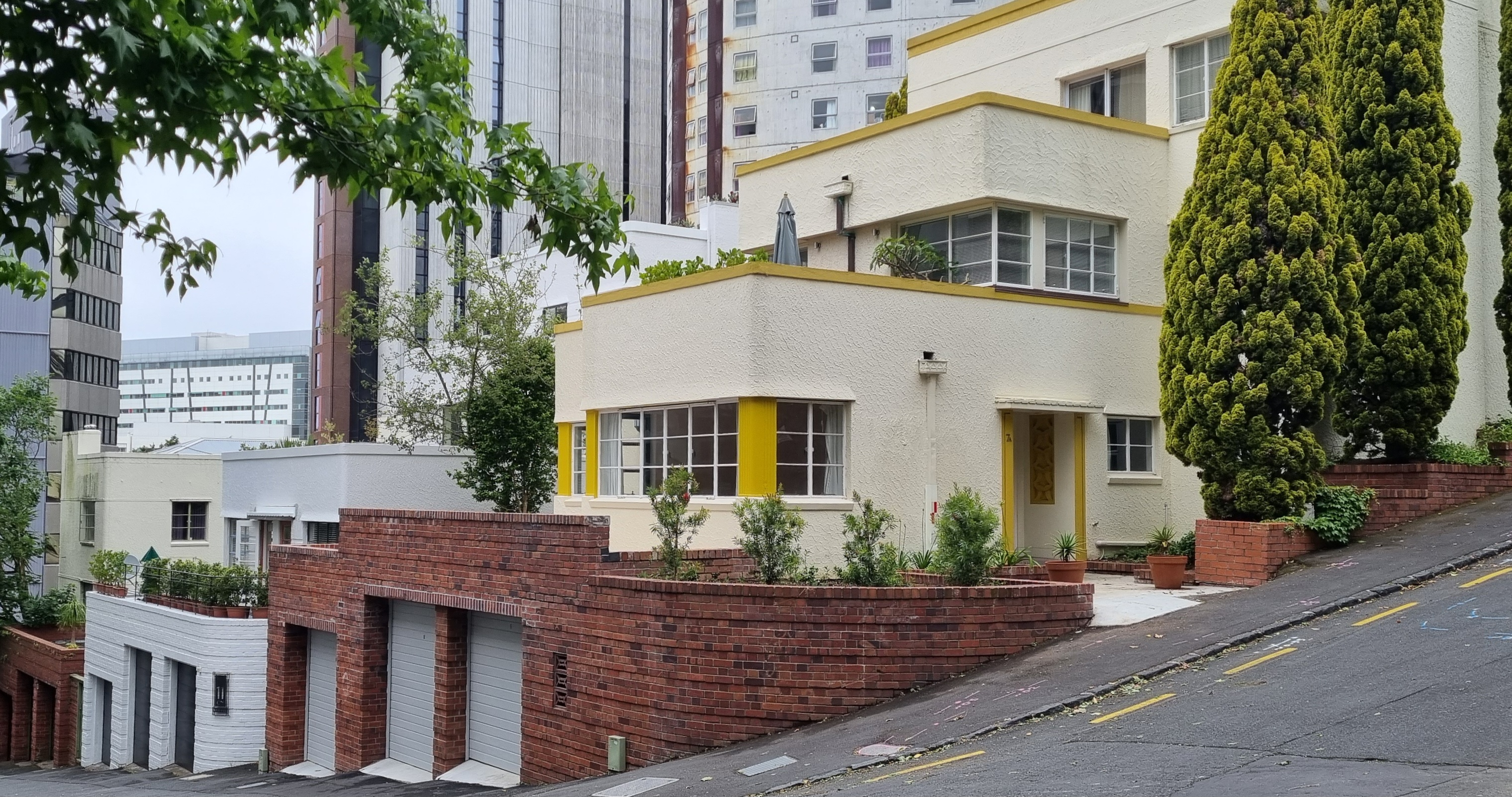
2022
