= Horace Massey =

New Zealand architect (1895–1978)

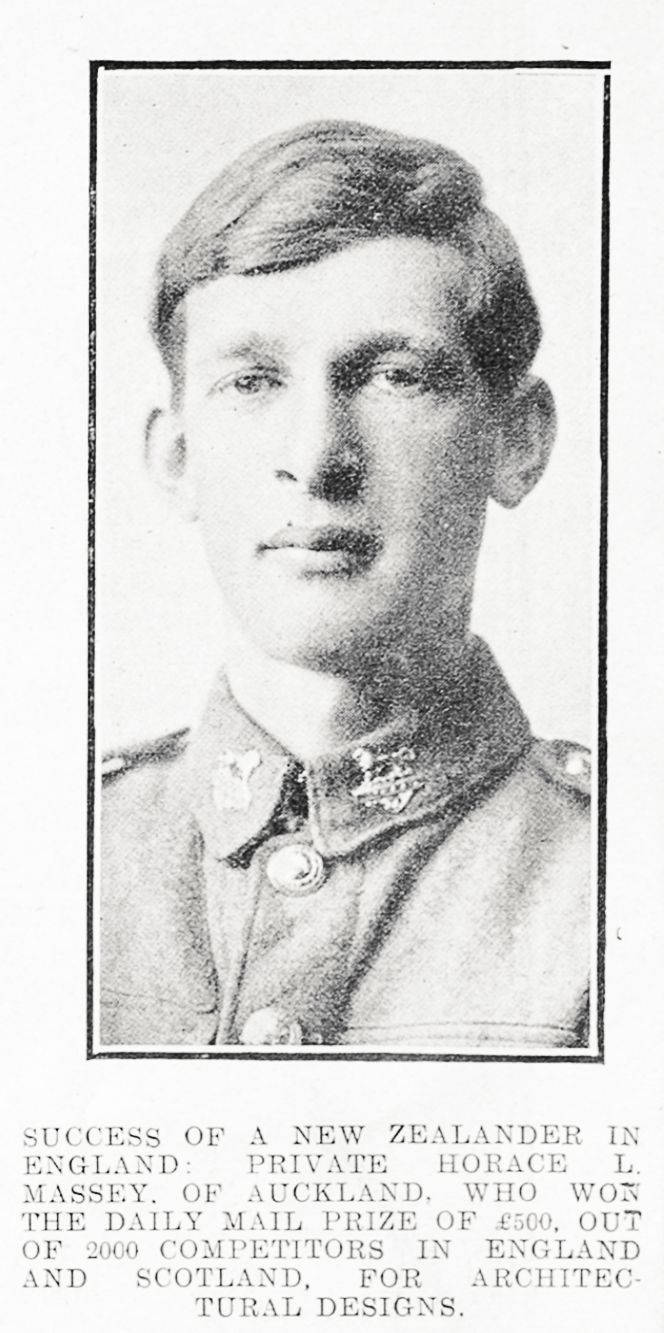
- Born: 1 April 1895; Mount Eden, Auckland, New Zealand
- Died: 9 August 1978 (aged 83); Tauranga, New Zealand
- Occupation: Architect
- Buildings: St Michael's Catholic Church, Auckland (1933); Wellington Provincial Centennial Memorial (1940)

Horace Lovell Massey (1 April 1895 – 9 August 1978) was a New Zealand architect, who was active from the 1920s to the 1950, mostly in Auckland. He was the designer of a number of heritage-listed buildings, including St Michael's Catholic Church and the Wellington Provincial Centennial Memorial.

== Early life ==
Horace Lovell Massey was born in Mount Eden in Auckland, New Zealand, in April 1895. He was the only son of Walter Massey, a manager of a foodstuffs company, and his wife but his father died when he was a toddler. He was educated at Auckland Grammar School and once his education was completed, took up an apprenticeship in architecture. He later worked as an assistant to the architect William Gummer. In October 1916, two years after the outbreak of the First World War, he enlisted in the New Zealand Expeditionary Force. He was sent to France where he served with the 3rd Field Engineers until his discharge in April 1919. Remaining in England after his discharge, Massey secured a scholarship to the Architectural Association in London.

== Professional practice ==
Massey returned in New Zealand in 1921 and he went into a partnership with three other architects. He would design many residences in the Auckland suburb of Remuera over the next several years, with one architect of the period crediting him with around 20% of all architecturally designed homes in the area during the 1920s. One was Rendell House, executed in a Spanish Mission style in 1927, and later heritage listed by Heritage New Zealand.

In 1928 Massey went into partnership with another Auckland-based architect, George Tole. One of the houses produced by the partnership, known as Tole & Massey, was Heard House in Parnell, a residence that was heritage listed by the Historic Places Trust, the predecessor to Heritage New Zealand, in 1981. A prominent commission for Tole & Massey was St Michael's Catholic Church, the construction of which commenced in 1932. Opened the following year, it won the Gold Medal of the New Zealand Institute of Architects (NZIA) and the building was heritage listed in 1985. By 1935, Tole's partnership with Massey had ended.

In 1936, and now practicing on his own following the dissolution of his partnership with Tole, he designed Auckland's Cintra Flats in an Interwar-Functionalist style. His work on this project was recognised the following year with another award of the NZIA's gold medal and the flats, in Grafton, was subsequently heritage listed in 1981. Another block of flats designed by Massey was the Gloucester Court Flats in Ponsonby which, like the Cintra Flats, are heritage listed.

Working in conjunction with fellow architect Alfred Morgan, Massey designed the Central Library in Whangārei. It was executed in a style that combined elements of Stripped Classical and Art Deco. Built in 1936, it is now a heritage listed building. He and Morgan received the NZIA's gold medal in 1938 for their design and the two would work together on other public buildings in Whangārei, including the girl's high school.

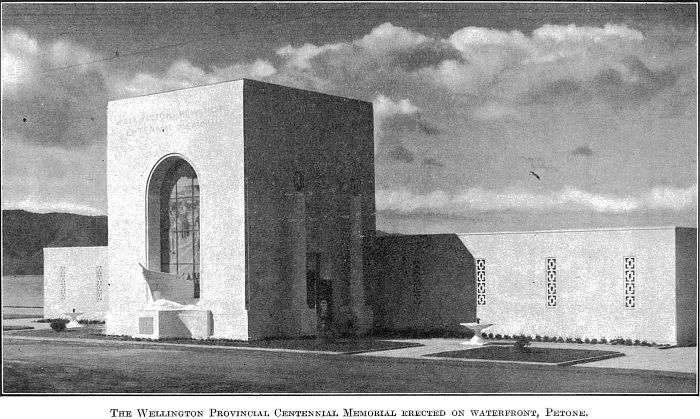
Massey's Wellington Provincial Centennial Memorial, built in 1940

Massey was the architect of the Wellington Provincial Centennial Memorial, which was opened in 1940 as part of the celebration of the European settlement of New Zealand. Historian Gavin McLean describes the building as 'Wellington's provincial memorial but in many ways the New Zealand monument to pioneer endeavour'. Another of Massey's designs for which he used Stripped Classical and Art Deco styles, the Memorial is now the Petone Settlers Museum and was heritage listed in 1984. For his work Massey received the NZIA's gold medal for the fourth time.

== Later life ==
Massey, who served a term as the president of the NZIA commencing in 1941, was on the committee that selected the winner of the competition for the design for the memorial for the recently deceased New Zealand Prime Minister, Michael Savage, at Bastion Point in Auckland. He retired in 1957 and he and his wife Mary, who he had married in 1925, settled in Rotorua, where they had maintained a cottage as a base for trout fishing. The couple later moved to Te Puke. Massey died in nearby Tauranga in August 1978.
