= Te Kakapi-o-te-rangi Te Wharepōuri =

Te Kakapi-o-te-rangi Te Wharepōuri (c. 1895 – 22 November 1842) was a Te Āti Awa leader who played a significant role in the Wellington region in the early 19th century.

Te Wharepōuri belonged to the Ngāti Te Whiti and Ngāti Tawhirikura hapū of Te Āti Awa. He was the first cousin of Hōniana Te Puni-kōkopu.

Te Wharepōuri died on the 22nd of November 1842 in Ngāūranga. His body was taken to Pito-one for burial & a waka maumaharatanga was erected in Ngāūranga.
