= St Michael's Catholic Church, Auckland =

St Michael's Catholic Church
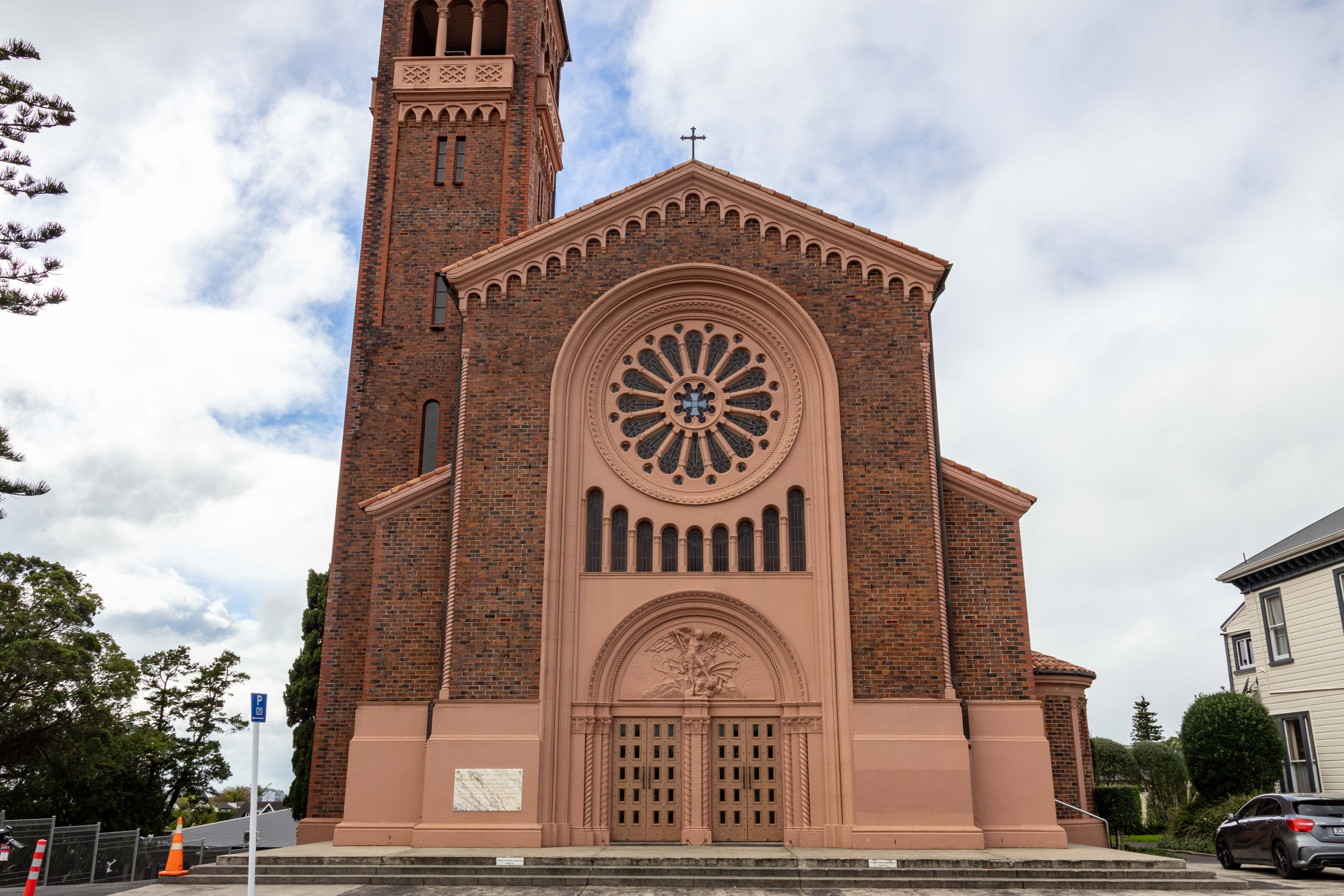
- St Michael's Catholic Church
- St Michael's Catholic Church
- 36°52′23″S 174°47′03″E
- Location: 6 Beatrice Road, Remuera, Auckland
- Country: New Zealand
- Denomination: Catholic
- Website: remueracatholic.org.nz

Architecture
- Architect(s): Tole and Massey
- Style: Gothic Revival; Italian Romanesque
- Years built: 1933

Administration
- Diocese: Auckland

Heritage New Zealand – Category 1
- Designated: 2 April 1985
- Reference no.: 118

St. Michael's Church is an heritage-listed Roman Catholic parish church located in Remuera, Auckland, New Zealand.

Completed in 1933, the church building was listed as a Category I Historic building by Heritage New Zealand on 2 April 1985.

== History ==
The church was designed by George Tole and Horace Massey. It opened in 1933 and was awarded the NZIA gold medal the same year.

The parish also operates St Michael's Catholic School, an integrated primary school established in 1916.
