= Petone Settlers Museum =

Coordinates: 41.229272°S 174.880177°E

Wellington Provincial Centennial Memorial
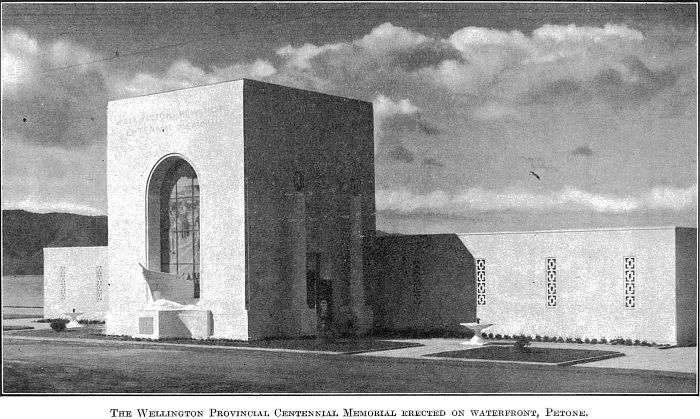
- Wellington Provincial Centennial Memorial c.1940
- Interactive map of the Wellington Provincial Centennial Memorial area

General information
- Type: Memorial
- Architectural style: Art Deco Stripped Classicism
- Location: The Esplanade, Petone, Lower Hutt, New Zealand
- Current tenants: Petone Settlers Museum
- Completed: 1939
- Owner: Hutt City Council

Design and construction
- Architect: Horace L. Massey
- Awards and prizes: NZIA Gold Medal 1940

Website
- http://www.petonesettlers.org.nz

Heritage New Zealand – Category 1
- Designated: 6 September 1984
- Reference no.: 206

Petone Settlers Museum is a local history museum located in the Wellington Provincial Centennial Memorial, a historic building in Petone, Lower Hutt, New Zealand. The building was originally constructed to mark the Wellington province's centennial commemorations; the museum opened in the building in 1977. The building was extensively refurbished in 2016.

The building is classified as a Category 1 historic building by Heritage New Zealand.

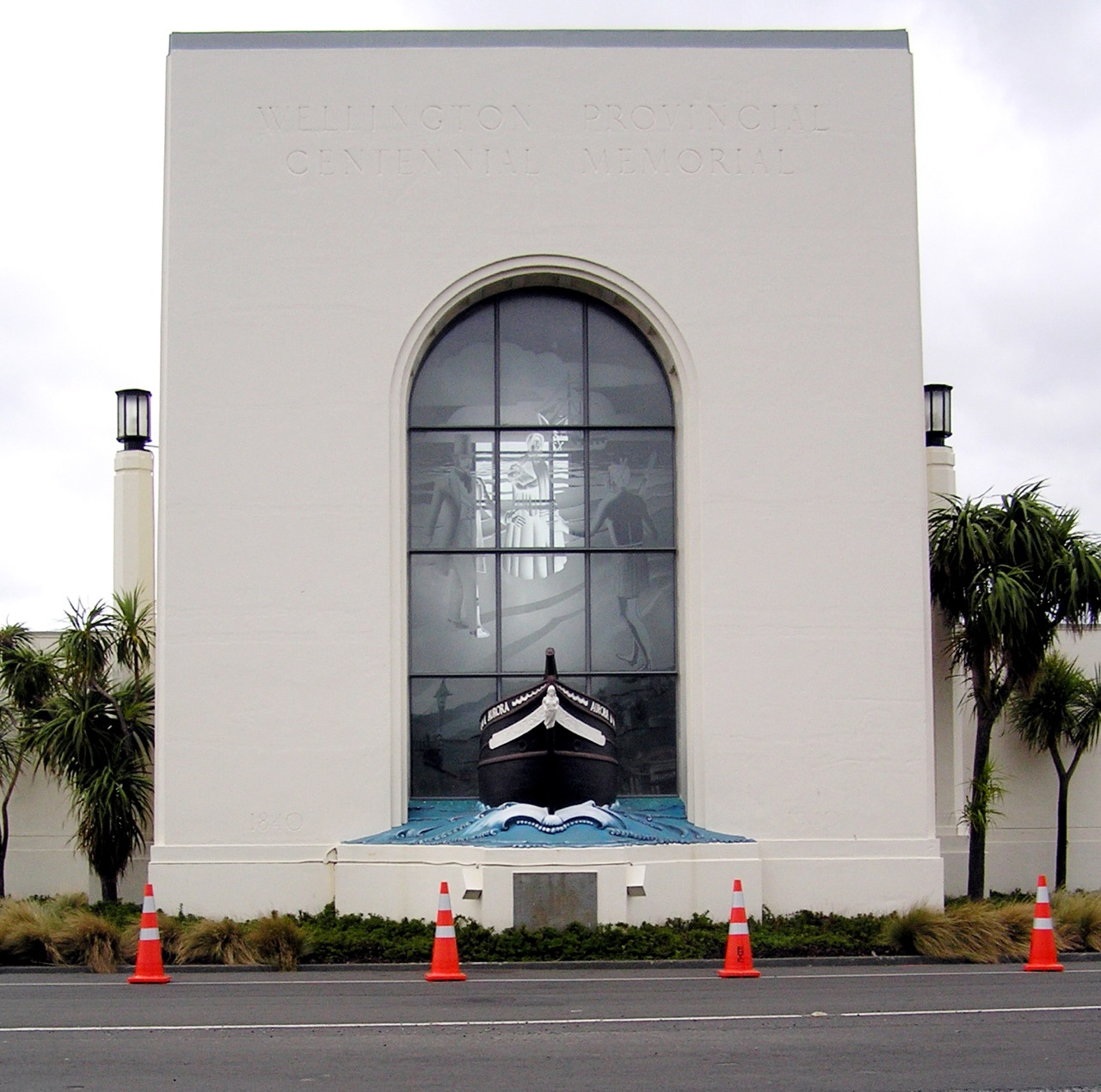
Petone Settlers Museum in 2005

== The site ==
The Wellington Centennial Provincial Memorial building is located on the Petone (originally 'Pito-one', or 'end of the sandy beach') foreshore and memorialises the site where local Māori welcomed the first ship carrying organised British settlers to Wellington on 22 January 1840. The positioning of the building is approximate, rather than precise.

Local Te Āti Awa chiefs including Te Puni and Te Wharepōuri sold tracts of land around the Wellington harbour to the New Zealand Company to provide land for settlement. The original settlement was built near Te Puni's pā in Petone.

== The building ==
Beginning in the mid 1930s, New Zealand's Labour-led government planned for the centennial celebrations to mark the 100th anniversary of the signing of the Treaty of Waitangi. While the New Zealand Centennial Exhibition in the Wellington suburb of Rongotai was the main centennial event, funds were made available for provincial memorials and events, including the construction of the Wellington Provincial Centennial Memorial on the Petone foreshore.

A national competition was held to find the final design of the building, and the Wellington architect William Gray Young adjudicated. The winner was Auckland-based architect Horace Lovell Massey (1895–1979). Massey was awarded the NZIA Gold Medal for this design. Historian Gavin McLean describes the building as 'Wellington's provincial memorial but in many ways the New Zealand monument to pioneer endeavour' and 'an enduring celebration of pioneering'.

The architecture of the memorial combines Stripped Classical and Art Deco motifs. A central Hall of Memories is flanked by two rooms originally designed as male and female changing rooms for the building's additional original purpose as a bathing pavilion. The building's primary features are a large sand-blasted glass window and a stone replica of the prow of the ship Aurora (the first of the New Zealand Company settler ships to arrive in Wellington) at the base of the window facing the street. On 18 December 1938, Ivor Te Puni, a descendant of chief Te Puni, wrote a letter to the Prime Minister requesting he also remember the Māori people who "gave" one hundred years ago. The result of this letter was the depiction of Te Puni on the stained glass window extending his hand in welcome to the new settlers, represented by a suit-clad man and a woman carrying a child.

The memorial was officially opened on 22 January 1940 in a ceremony led by Prime Minister Peter Fraser and Governor-General Lord Galway.

== Petone Settlers Museum ==
Discharge from a major abattoir on the Petone foreshore, the Gear Meat Factory, made swimming at Petone beach unpopular and the bathing pavilions fell into disrepair. In 1977 the western bathing pavilion was converted to the Petone Settlers Museum; two years later the museum extended into the eastern bathing pavilion.

Today the museum is a repository of information and objects relating to the history of Māori and Pakeha settlement in the surrounding area, as well as the social, cultural, sporting and industrial history of Petone.

In 2016 the museum underwent a major refurbishment to both the exterior and interior. The $250,000 refurbishment sought to bring back the original look and feel of the building. Features such as decorative concrete grills have been re-instated and the building restored to its original colour. The original beach-front opening at the rear of the building was reglazed, and coloured paint that had been applied to the ship prow and bas-relief sculptures on the building's exterior was replaced with a cream shade, returning them to their original monochromatic state.

While the project took place, contractors discovered the original tiled foot baths that swimmers had to walk through to get to changing rooms. The museum reopened on 29 May 2016 with a family open day celebrating the refurbishment. $75,000 was also spent refreshing the exhibition spaces inside.

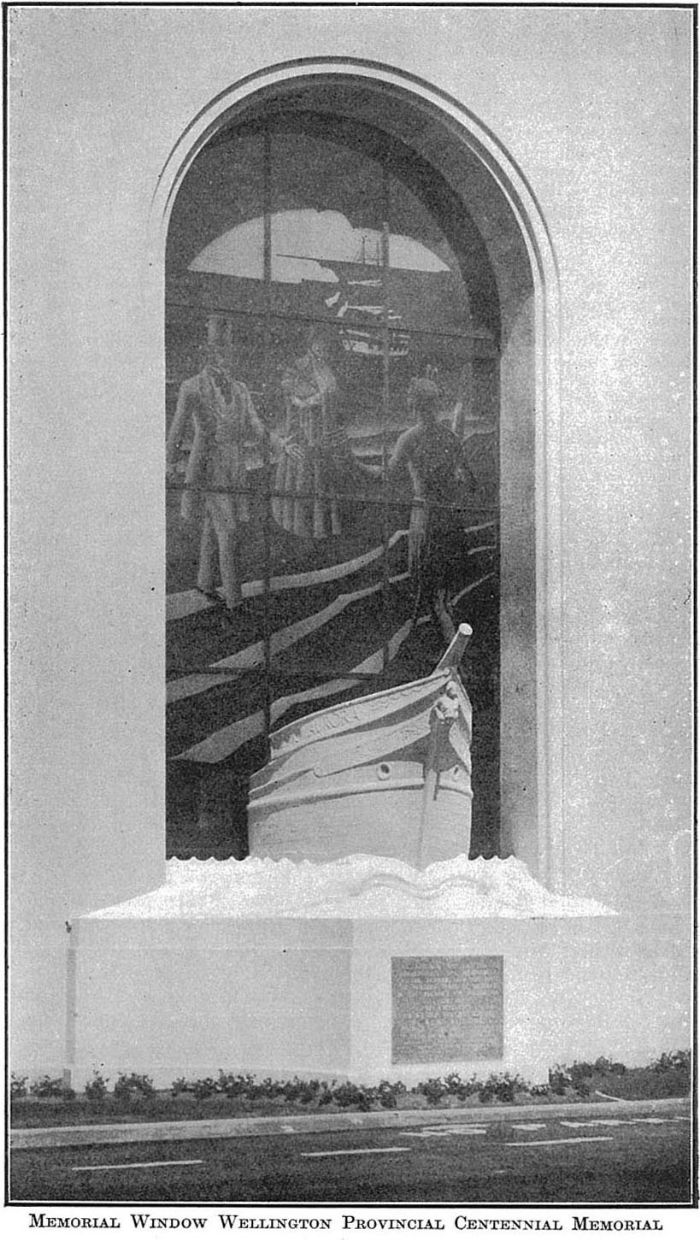
The Wellington Provincial Centennial Memorial Building's etched window and sculpture of the prow of the Aurora, c.1940
