= Petone =

Suburb of Lower Hutt, New Zealand

- Suburb
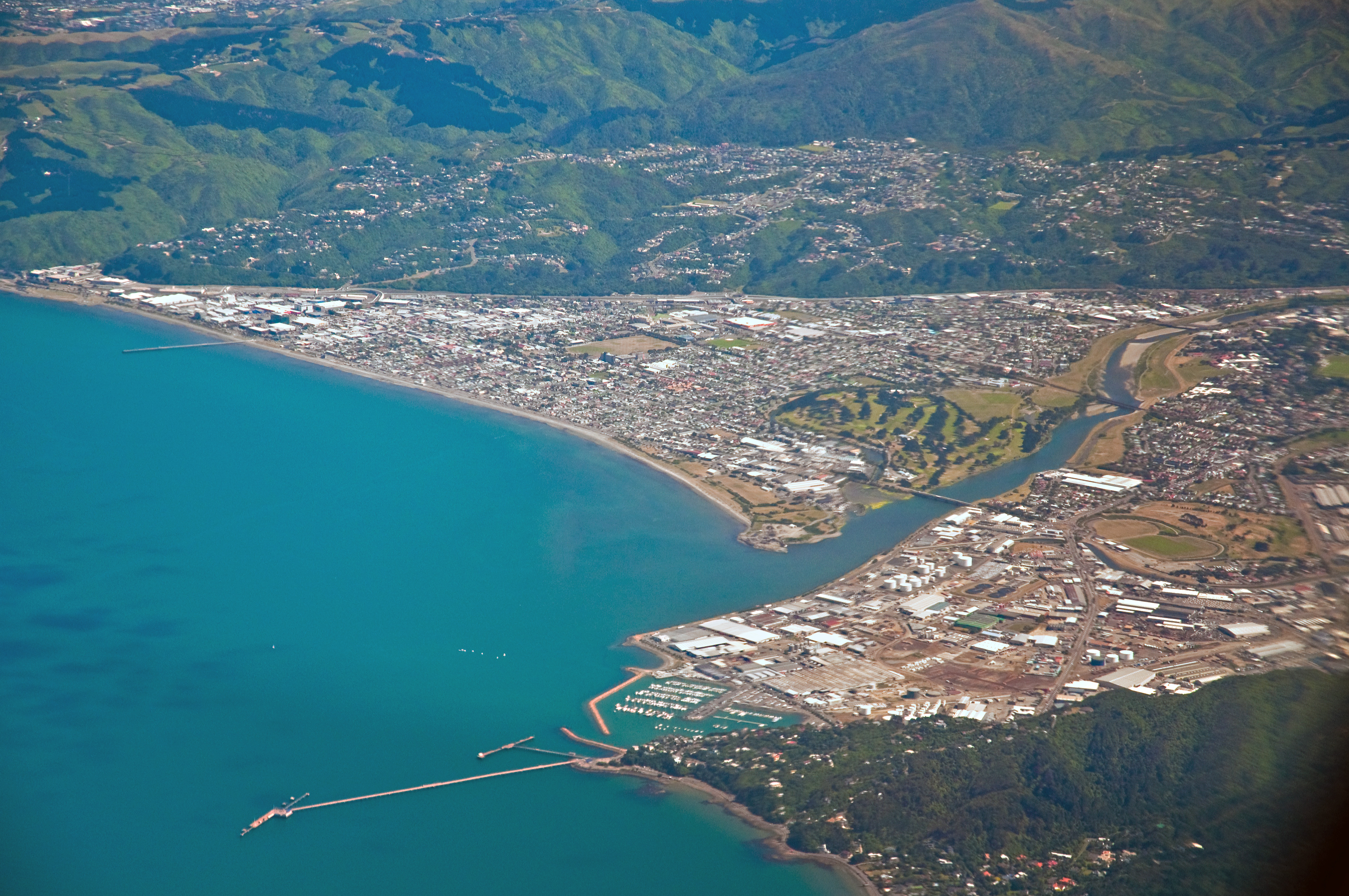
- Aerial view of Petone and Seaview
- Interactive map of Petone
- Coordinates: 41°13′30.00″S 174°52′40.80″E
- Country: New Zealand
- City: Lower Hutt
- Local authority: Hutt City Council
- Electoral ward: Harbour
- Established: 1840

Area
  - Land: 390 ha (960 acres)

Population (June 2025)
  - Total: 8,140
  - Density: 2,100/km^{2} (5,400/sq mi)
- Postcode: 5012
- Train stations: Petone Railway Station; Ava Railway Station

| Korokoro | Maungaraki | Alicetown |
| Horokiwi | Petone | Moera |
| | Wellington Harbour | Seaview |

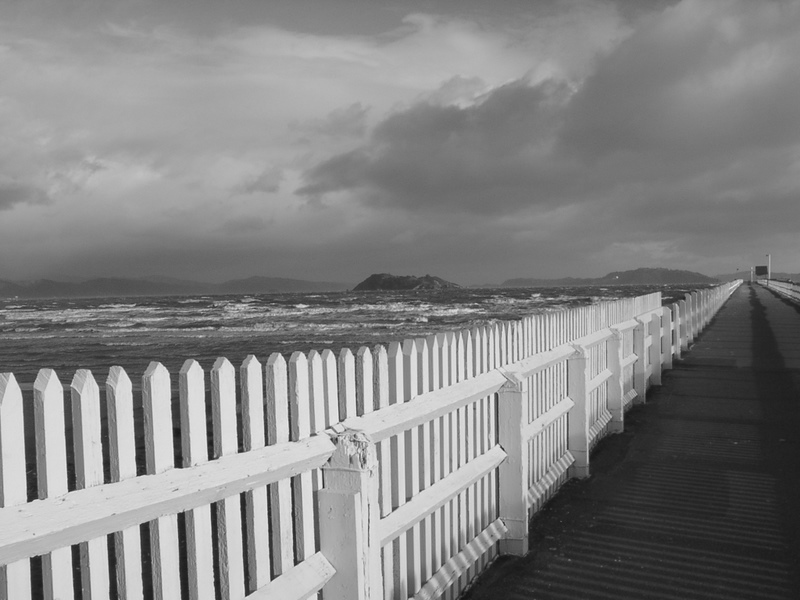
Petone Wharf on a stormy day

Petone (Māori: Pito-one) is a large suburb of Lower Hutt, Wellington, New Zealand. It stands at the southern end of the Hutt Valley, on the northern shore of Wellington Harbour. Europeans first settled in Petone in January 1840, making it the oldest European settlement in the Wellington Region. It became a borough in 1888, and merged with Lower Hutt (branded as "Hutt City") in 1989.

== Etymology ==
The Māori name Pito-one has long been taken to mean the end (pito) of the sand (one), referring to the long sandy beach at Petone with pā at each end of the beach. However in 2024 The New Zealand Geographic Board suggested that Pito-one means "an umbilical cord (pito) buried in the sand (one)", as a symbolic tethering of a newborn to the whenua (land) in Māori culture.

On 6 September 2024, the Hutt City Council voted to officially name the suburb "Pito One". This proposed name change was supported by the New Zealand Geographic Board, The Wellington Tenths Trust and the Palmerston North Māori Reserve Trust. On 19 December 2024, Minister for Land Information Chris Penk chose to decline the change, stating that "people feel strongly about the name of their home and each proposal received a range of submissions both for and against".

== Geography ==
Petone is on flat land, between Hutt River to the north and east, hills on the west and Wellington Harbour to the south. The land along the foreshore was uplifted by a metre or more in the 1855 Wairarapa earthquake, which improved drainage around the mouth of Hutt River. The foreshore has a shallow sandy beach, formed by sediment from the Hutt River, which is a popular family swimming spot. Korokoro Stream enters Wellington Harbour at the western end of the Petone foreshore, and drains a catchment in Belmont Regional Park.

As a low-lying suburb, Petone is vulnerable to tsunami and flooding. During a severe storm on 20 December 1976, Korokoro Stream caused flooding almost a metre deep in the industrial area of Petone around Cornish Street, and more than 40 people had to be rescued from factory roofs.

== History ==
There were two Māori pā (fortified settlements), belonging to Te Āti Awa, at Pito-one near the beach when the first European settlers arrived in the region. At the western end of the beach was the Pito-one pā, near the current Te Puni Street, and at the other end near the mouth of the Hutt River stood Hikoikoi pā. In 1850 the pā at Pito-one was described as "the largest and best fortified within the District of Wellington ... their cultivations of kumara and maize look well and the residents, in point of comfort and wealth, are better off than any of the Port Nicholson natives ... total population 136".

Around 1840, Edward Jerningham Wakefield described the locality as a "sandy beach, which is about two miles long. The main river falls into the sea at the eastern end ... and is called the Heretaunga [Hutt River]. A merry brawling stream, called the Korokoro, or "throat", flows between [Pito-one pa] and the western hills. The valley ... [is] bounded on either side by wooded hills from 300 to 400 feet in height. It was covered with high forest to within a mile and a half of the beach, when swamps full of flax and a belt of sand hummocks intervened."

Petone was the first European settlement in the Wellington region and retains many historical buildings and landmarks. The first European settlers in large numbers arrived on 22 January 1840 on the ship Aurora, which brought 25 married couples, 36 single people and 40 children. The Aurora is commemorated in the Petone Settlers Museum, which has a sculpture shaped like the bow of the ship protruding from the front of the building. Māori from the nearby Pito-one pā came to meet the new arrivals, with one passenger recording in his diary: "The first great object of attraction was the venerable old chief Te Puni, his interesting and beautiful wife 'Victoria,' and his handsome daughter Aena, the princess, together with sons and endless relatives and a pa full of natives who were delighted to greet us with 'Kapai te Pakeha,' Tena-koe, and other expressions of greeting."

A settlement of small wooden houses and tents was established along the western side of the Hutt River (near the current Wilford School), which was initially called Britannia. The earliest European settlers found life hard. Nevertheless, the settlement grew: the population of "Pito-one and Hutt" in 1845 was given as 649, compared to, "Town of Wellington" of 2,667. There was horse racing at Pito-one Beach on 20 October 1842, attracting a crowd of five or six hundred people from Wellington.

After repeated flooding, most settlers moved south around the harbour to Thorndon. Thorndon is at the shore of what is now the city of Wellington, New Zealand's capital.

From the late 19th century and for much of the 20th century, Petone was a thriving, largely working-class town. It was the location of several large industrial sites, including car assembly plants, a meat processing plant, a wool processing plant, a tobacco processing plant, a soap factory and a toothpaste factory. The majority of these closed in the 1970s and 1980s, resulting in gradual economic decline in the area.

=== Defunct industries ===
- Petone Railway Workshops 1876–1929
- Gear Meat Company 1882–1981
- Wellington Woollen Manufacturing Company 1883–1968 (company founded 1883, manufacture began at Petone in 1886)
- Lever Brothers soap factory (later became Unilever) 1919–2015
- W.D. & H.O. Wills tobacco factory 1919–2020
- New Zealand Motor Bodies vehicle assembly plant 1926–1978 (the company later became Coachwork International)
- General Motors vehicle assembly plant 1926–1984
- Todd Motors vehicle assembly plant 1935–1974. The company closed the Petone factory after building a new plant at Porirua in the early 1970s.
- Colgate-Palmolive toothpaste and toiletries factory 1939–2007
- Austin Motor Industries vehicle assembly plant (later New Zealand Motor Corporation, then Emco Group) 1946–1983

Petone gained borough status in 1888. The borough's first coat of arms had images representing the Gear Meat Company, the woollen mills and the railway workshops, showing how important these businesses were to the local economy. Petone Borough amalgamated with Lower Hutt as a result of the local government reform in 1989. The suburb has since enjoyed renewed economic growth, using its early European heritage as a draw for tourists and gaining many cafes and shops.

Petone is home to the Petone Rugby Club founded in 1885.

Railway employee, fireman, and photographer Albert Percy Godber (1875–1949) photographed railway infrastructure and trains, industries, Māori artworks, sights, and workers in Petone capturing a perspective from an earlier era. The Alexander Turnbull Library has a collection of his photographs.

=== State housing ===
New Zealand's first state housing was constructed at the east end of Petone in 1906. Historian Ben Schrader has identified that this housing (known as the Heretaunga Settlement) may be the first national government-led housing development in the world. The Heretaunga Settlement has been declared a Historic Area by Heritage New Zealand. Some of the original houses remain in good condition, and the local tourist office provides a guide showing where they are located. Some of the houses in Patrick Street are listed as Historic Places by Heritage New Zealand.

Star Flats (state housing apartment blocks built in the 1960s) are located in Jackson Street and East Street.

== Demographics ==
Petone, comprising the statistical areas of Petone Central, Petone East and Petone Esplanade, covers 3.90 km^{2} (1.51 sq mi). It had an estimated population of 8,140 as of June 2025, with a population density of 2,087 people per km^{2}.

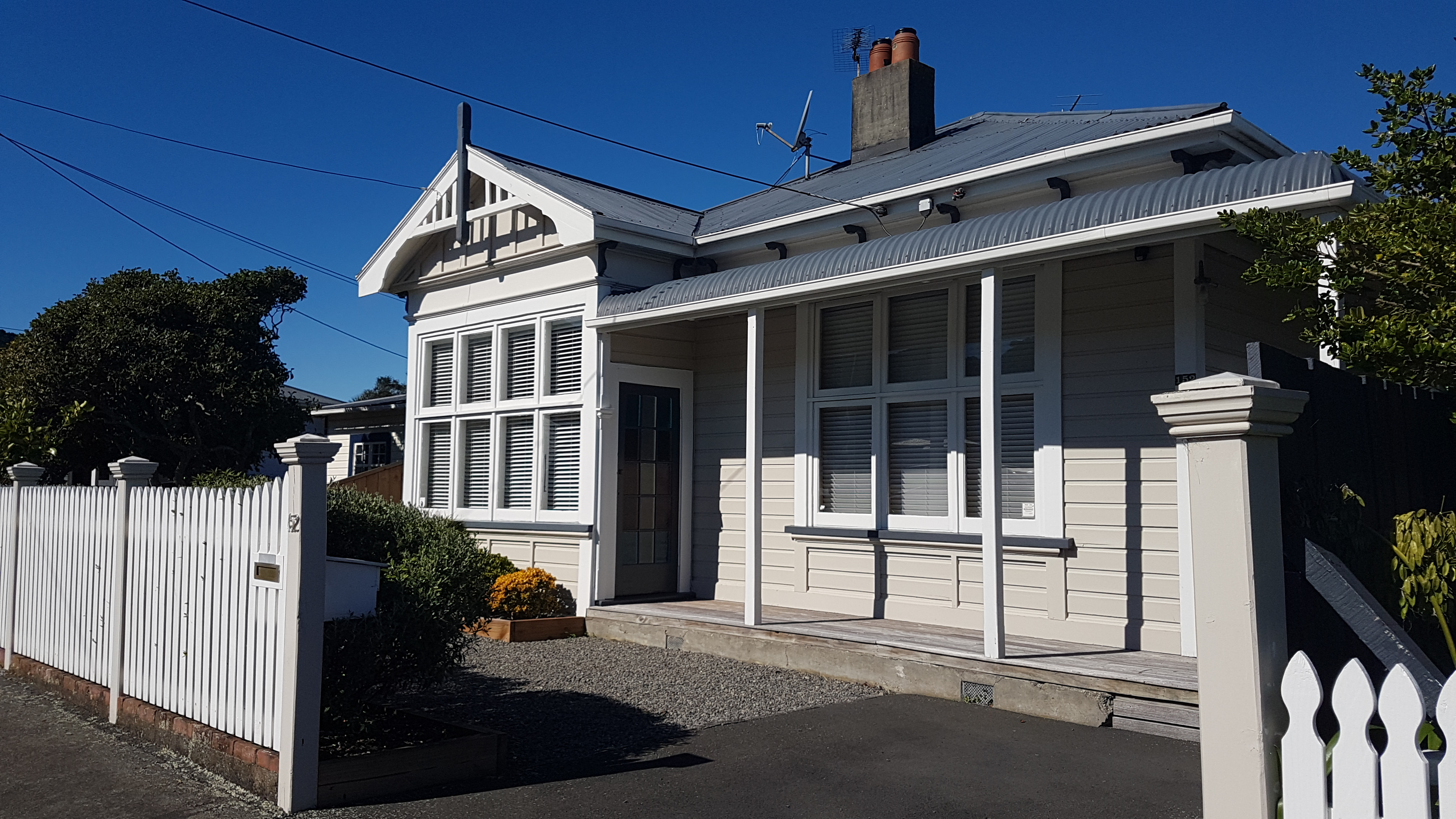
Typical wooden house in Petone

Historical population
| Year | Pop. | ±% p.a. |
|---|---|---|
| 2006 | 6,546 | — |
| 2013 | 6,672 | +0.27% |
| 2018 | 7,491 | +2.34% |
| 2023 | 7,734 | +0.64% |

Petone had a population of 7,734 in the 2023 New Zealand census, an increase of 243 people (3.2%) since the 2018 census, and an increase of 1,062 people (15.9%) since the 2013 census. There were 3,873 males, 3,822 females, and 39 people of other genders in 3,270 dwellings. 5.3% of people identified as LGBTIQ+. The median age was 39.4 years (compared with 38.1 years nationally). There were 1,035 people (13.4%) aged under 15 years, 1,491 (19.3%) aged 15 to 29, 3,828 (49.5%) aged 30 to 64, and 1,380 (17.8%) aged 65 or older.

People could identify as more than one ethnicity. The results were 70.0% European (Pākehā); 16.7% Māori; 8.2% Pasifika; 17.5% Asian; 2.1% Middle Eastern, Latin American and African New Zealanders (MELAA); and 1.4% other, which includes people giving their ethnicity as "New Zealander". English was spoken by 95.8%, Māori by 4.6%, Samoan by 2.7%, and other languages by 17.5%. No language could be spoken by 2.0% (e.g. too young to talk). New Zealand Sign Language was known by 0.5%. The percentage of people born overseas was 29.2, compared with 28.8% nationally.

Religious affiliations were 32.4% Christian, 4.8% Hindu, 0.9% Islam, 1.0% Māori religious beliefs, 0.8% Buddhist, 0.5% New Age, 0.2% Jewish, and 2.1% other religions. People who answered that they had no religion were 52.1%, and 5.3% of people did not answer the census question.

Of those at least 15 years old, 2,400 (35.8%) people had a bachelor's or higher degree, 2,883 (43.0%) had a post-high school certificate or diploma, and 1,413 (21.1%) people exclusively held high school qualifications. The median income was $51,000, compared with $41,500 nationally. 1,206 people (18.0%) earned over $100,000 compared to 12.1% nationally. The employment status of those at least 15 was 3,792 (56.6%) full-time, 729 (10.9%) part-time, and 195 (2.9%) unemployed.

Individual statistical areas
| Name | Area (km^{2}) | Population | Density (per km^{2}) | Dwellings | Median age | Median income |
|---|---|---|---|---|---|---|
| Petone Central | 1.30 | 1,182 | 909 | 528 | 33.8 years | $57,000 |
| Petone East | 1.63 | 3,978 | 2,440 | 1,665 | 42.3 years | $47,900 |
| Petone Esplanade | 0.97 | 2,571 | 2571 | 1,077 | 38.3 years | $51,700 |
| New Zealand | | | | | 38.1 years | $41,500 |

== Points of interest ==
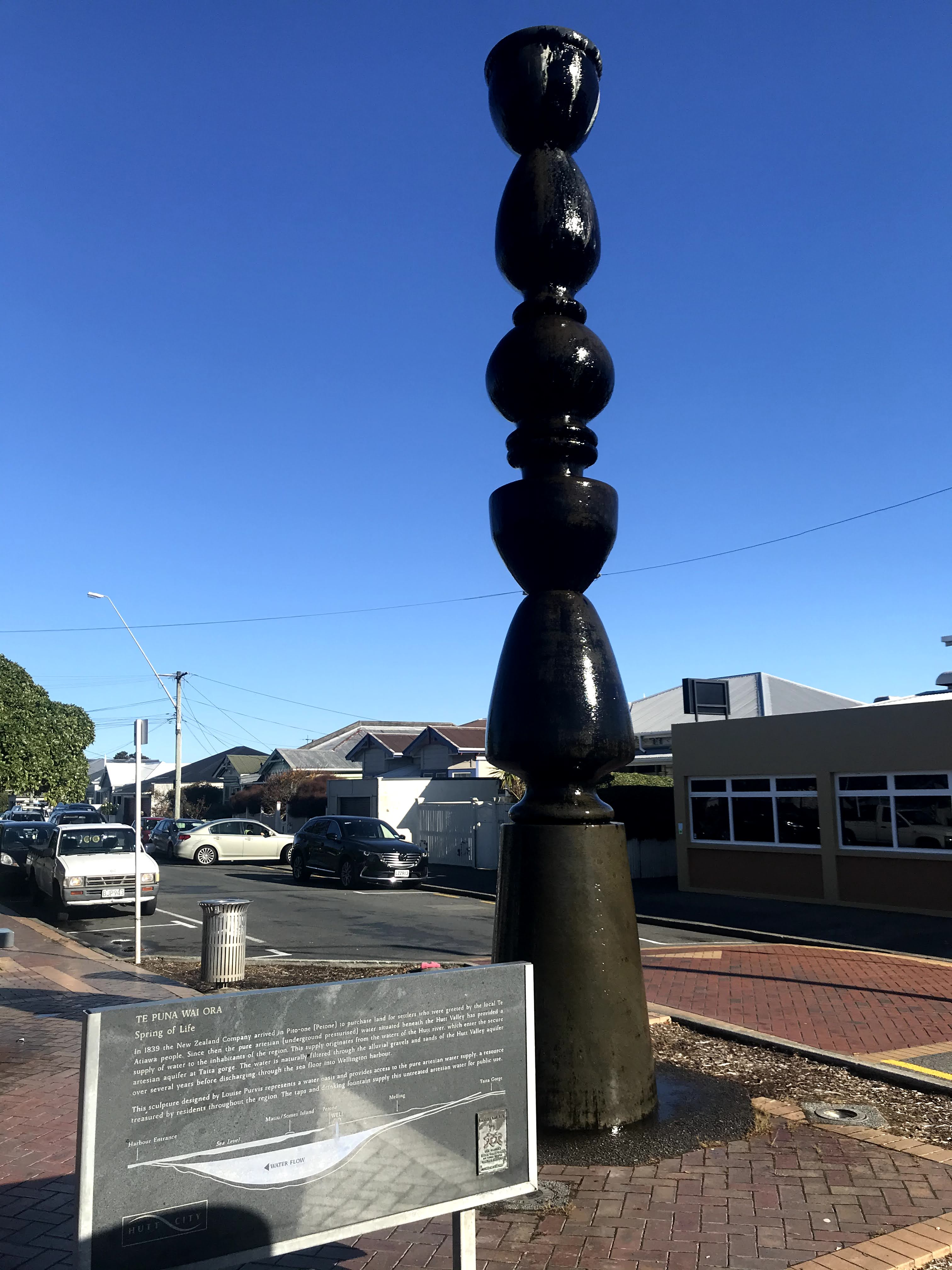
Te Puna Wai Ora fountain at Buick Street.

=== Jackson Street ===
Petone's main street has over 220 businesses (most are small unique businesses), is a hub for hospitality, and is listed by Heritage New Zealand as a historic area. Petone's former police station and jail, built in 1908, were moved to a site on Jackson Street in 1994 from Elizabeth Street, and is home to the Jackson Street Programme Inc. (JSP) which was established in 1992. The Historic Police Station is the JSP's office, and has information on Jackson Street and Petone for visitors and tourists. The Old Jail became a museum with exhibits about policing in Petone and the history of Jackson Street. Jackson Street also features a 'Walk of Champions': over 140 bronze plaques have been laid on the footpath celebrating 200 local sportspeople who have represented New Zealand or become national champions in their sport.

=== St David's Church ===
St David's is a Presbyterian church at 4 Britannia Street with a Heritage New Zealand Category 2 listing. It was built in 1889 in a simple Colonial Gothic style designed by Christian Toxward. Originally it had a large steeple but this was later removed after being damaged by weather and rot. In 1993 the steeple was restored and a porte cochere was added. The church has a decorated pipe organ and there is a large stained glass memorial window. The church is now used for services by the Samoan community.

=== St Augustine's Church ===
St Augustine's is an Anglican church at 12 Britannia Street which has a Heritage New Zealand Category 2 listing. The church is built of wood, and was designed by Frederick de Jersey Clere in a gothic style. When it was built in 1902-1903 it had the tallest spire in New Zealand, but the spire was removed in 1954 after being damaged in a storm.

=== Te Puna Wai Ora ===
The Te Puna Wai Ora (Spring of Life) in Buick Street provides artesian water from taps. The water originates from the Waiwhetu Aquifer and has been naturally filtered through the alluvial gravels and sands of the Hutt Valley over several years. It is free, and consumers travel long distances to collect the water for drinking purposes. In June 2017, a small ultraviolet water treatment unit was installed to ensure on-going safety of the drinking water.

=== Petone Settlers Museum ===
Petone Settlers Museum is housed in the Wellington Provincial Centennial Memorial Building on the Petone foreshore, opposite Buick Street. The building was opened on Wellington Anniversary Day 1940 to commemorate the arrival of the ship Aurora and the first European settlement in Wellington. It is a building of national significance.

=== Iona Cross ===
In February 1940 a stone cross was erected on the Petone foreshore near the Settlers Museum, to commemorate 100 years since the first Presbyterian church service in New Zealand was held on board the settler ship Bengal Merchant at Petone on 23 February 1840. The cross is 2.7 m (15 ft) high and carved on one side. The cross was supposed to have been a replica of the MacLean Cross at Iona in Scotland donated by the Church of Scotland, but due to the outbreak of World War 2 this was not possible. Instead, the cross was carved in Auckland or Coromandel, and is made of Coromandel Tonalite, a type of rock formerly quarried on the Coromandel Peninsula. The cross has a 'Historic Place Category 2' listing from Heritage New Zealand.

=== Hōniana Te Puni-kōkopu memorial ===
The Hōniana Te Puni-kōkopu memorial can be found in the Te Puni Street urūpa (burial ground).

=== Hōniana Te Puni Reserve ===
Hōniana Te Puni Reserve is a 5-hectare grassed reserve at the western end of the Petone foreshore. The reserve, formerly known as 'Korokoro Gateway', was given to Taranaki Whānui ki Te Upoko o Te Ika in 2009 as part of a Treaty settlement and is managed by Hutt City Council. Wellington Rowing Association and Wellington Water Ski Club have buildings on the site, and the reserve is popular with walkers and as a dog exercise area. A pouwhenua (carved pole) was erected on the reserve in 2000. The pouwhenua represents chief Honiana Te Puni and commemorates the arrival of the first European settlers at Petone. It was carved by Bryce Manukonga of Te Āti Awa. The pouwhenua was repaired and reinstalled at the reserve in 2019. As of 2023 the reserve is being used as a work space by contractors building Te Ara Tupua, a cycleway connecting Petone and Wellington.

=== Hikoikoi Reserve ===
The reserve is a park and walkway at the mouth of the Hutt River. It features a disc-golf course. The reserve was the site of Ngati Awa's Hikoikoi Pa.

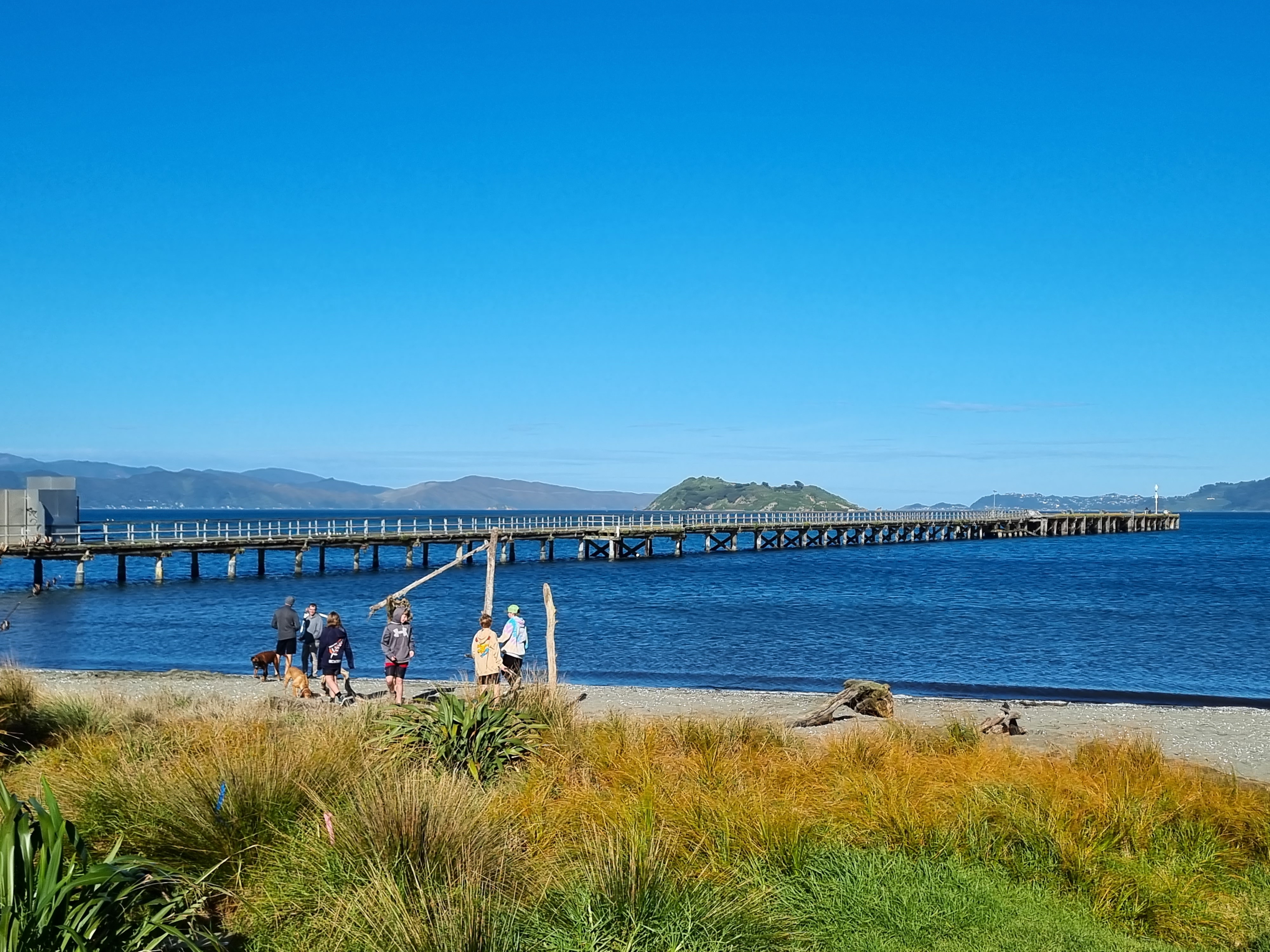
Petone Wharf, 2023.

=== Petone Wharf ===
One remnant of Petone's industrial history is the Petone Wharf. The original wharf was built to allow the Gear Meat Works to move its products quickly to Wellington for export. That wharf was demolished and the current wharf built slightly further north along the shore in 1908-1909. The wharf was popular with walkers and people fishing, but was closed to the public in January 2021 after suffering earthquake damage in the 2016 Kaikōura earthquake and two smaller subsequent earthquakes. In May 2021 Hutt City Council voted to repair the wharf, but in November 2023 announced that it would be demolished. There were protests from the community, including one event in April 2024 where over 1,000 people demonstrated their objections. In April 2025, the council made provision in their ten year plan for $12 million for work on the wharf. In 2026 a contract was signed for a partial restoration of the wharf and work began in October. The scope included repair of the first 290 m (950 ft) of the wharf and improving seismic resilience, followed by repair of 60 m (200 ft) of the wharf head, and demolition of the remaining 50 m (160 ft) that was found to be in "particularly poor condition".

== Petone Rotary Fair ==
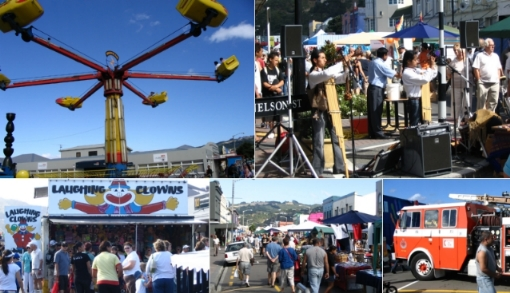
Scenes from the Petone Rotary Fair

The Petone Rotary Fair is a notable local event, held annually since 1992, that draws people from all over the greater Wellington region to Jackson Street, Petone's main thoroughfare, which is closed off to traffic for the event.

The purpose of the fair is not only to raise the profile of Petone and provide an enjoyable day out, but to raise money for charity. The fair consists of various stalls selling products such as plants, artwork, jewellery, CDs & DVDs, cosmetics, food and drink, etc., and there are musicians, carnival rides, and displays from various organisations such as the New Zealand Fire Service.

== Education ==
Petone has three schools:

- Petone Central School is a state full primary (Year 1–8) school in central Petone, with 192 students. It opened in 1882.
- Sacred Heart School is a state-integrated Catholic full primary (Year 1–8) school in central Petone, and has 153 students. It opened in 1904 and was rebuilt on the same site in 1988.
- Wilford School is a state full primary (Year 1–8) school in north-eastern Petone, and has 207 students. It opened c. 1961.

All these schools are co-educational. Rolls are as of July 2026.

Petone College was established in 1904 as Petone Technical School, and became Petone Technical College in 1930. In 1937, it became Hutt Valley Memorial Technical College. It became a boys' school in 1958, and was called Central Technical College. In 1963, it returned to being co-educational. In 1981, it became Central College, and in 1994, Petone College. It closed in 1998. Since then, Hutt Valley High School in central Lower Hutt has been the nearest state secondary school to Petone.

The main campus of the Wellington Institute of Technology (Weltec) is located in Petone.

== See also ==
- Automotive industry in New Zealand
