= Hōniana Te Puni-kōkopu =

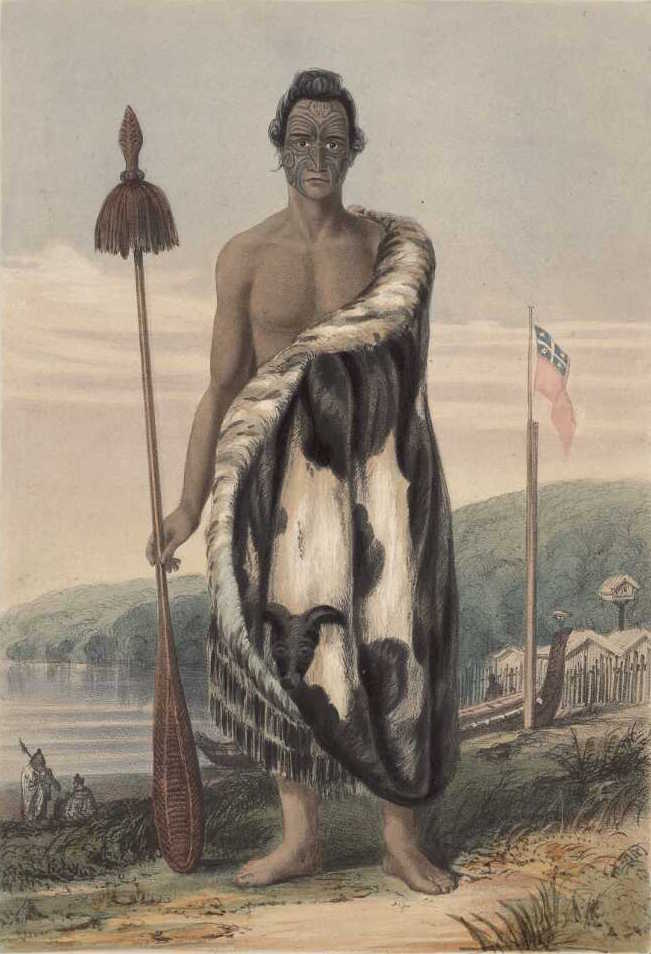
Illustration of Hōniana Te Puni-kōkopu, c. 1839

Hōniana Te Puni (died 5 December 1870) was a Te Āti Awa leader and government member who played a significant role in the Wellington region in the early to mid 19th century.

Te Puni belonged to the Ngāti Te Whiti and Ngāti Tawhirikura hapū of Te Ātiawa. Born in Taranaki his mother was Te Puku and his father was the chief Rerewha-i-te-rangi. He acquired the name 'Te Puni-kokopu' ('puni' for pool, 'kokopu' for fresh water fish) as a young man, when to escape an invading force attacking Rewarewa pa (located near to present-day New Plymouth) he and his father's younger brother Raua-ki-tua leapt from the pa down a cliff-face into the Waiwhakaiho River and swam to safety.

Te Puni was closely associated with his younger cousin Te Wharepōuri. In about 1820 the two were part of the defence of Pukerangiora pa in Taranaki, and in 1822 both were part of the battle against Waikato fighters at Motunui. He and Te Wharepōuri made contact with whalers and traders Dicky Barrett and Jacky Love in Ngamotu (now New Plymouth) in the 1820s. In about 1828 Te Puni sailed to Sydney on board the Tohora.

In 1832, realising that the invasions from Waikato iwi were not going to cease, a large number of Te Ati Awa, including Te Puni, Te Wharepōuri, Te Puni's uncle Raua-ki-tua, Ngatata-i-te-rangi and his son Wi Tako Ngātata, and the families of Love and Barrett, migrated overland south to Waikanae and Te Whanganui-a-Tara (Wellington Harbour). The migration is known as Te Heke Tama-te-uaua. Over the next few years Te Puni moved around the wider Wellington region, settling for times in Waikanae, near Porirua, in Featherston, and on Matiu / Somes Island. By 1836 Te Wharepōuri was settled in Ngauranga and Te Puni was invited from Matiu / Somes Island to settle in Pito-one (present-day Petone).

On 27 September 1839, Te Puni signed a deed of settlement with the New Zealand Company that saw the purchase of much of the Wellington region by British settlers. Te Puni was also a signatory to the Treaty of Waitangi, signing Sheet 8, The Cook Strait (Henry Williams) Sheet, in Wellington on 29 April 1840.

Te Puni died on 5 December 1870 and was buried in the family ūrūpa (cemetery) two days later with a funeral that came close in scale to a state funeral. The ship Rangatira sailed from Wellington to Petone carrying soldiers and the garrison band; banks, government offices and many shops were closed. The Bishop of Wellington, Octavius Hadfield, read the funeral service in Māori and three volleys were fired over Te Puni's grave by members of the Hutt Volunteers.

== Memorials ==
The Lower Hutt suburb of Epuni is named after Te Puni; it is an erroneous form of the chief's name recorded by early Wellington settlers.

Te Puni Street in Petone is named after his whanau (family), and an Oamaru stone memorial was erected in 1872 in his memory in the Te Puni ūrūpa (cemetery) two years after his death, designed by Colonial Architect William Clayton. In 1940 Deputy Prime Minister Walter Nash laid a wreath at the memorial as part of commemorations of Wellington's centennial. Te Puni is depicted on a large glass window on the Wellington Provincial Centennial Memorial welcoming British settlers to the harbour.
