= 1860 Dunedin Country by-election =

New Zealand by-election

The Dunedin Country by-election 1860 was a by-election held in the multi-member Dunedin Country electorate during the 2nd New Zealand Parliament. The by-election was caused by the resignation of incumbent MP William Cargill. The nomination meeting was held on 28 March and as Thomas Gillies was the only person proposed, he was declared elected unopposed.

== Background ==
The Dunedin Country electorate was one of the original 24 parliamentary electorates of New Zealand from 1853, and it was one of the two-member electorates. From the 1855 election, the electorate was represented by William and John Cargill, a father and son team. Cargill Jr. was one of many members of the House of Representatives who resigned prior to the second session of the 2nd New Zealand Parliament; the house had not been convened in 1857. In the resulting 1858 Dunedin Country by-election, he was replaced by John Parkin Taylor. Cargill Sr. rarely spoke in the house and found travel to parliament in Auckland difficult. Regarded as the father of Otago, he had also been the first Superintendent of Otago Province. In July 1859, he announced "that it has been his feeling for some time past, under a sense of advancing years, to retire from the Superintendency". He did retire at the next provincial election in November 1859. Cargill senior resigned from the House of Representatives on 12 December 1859.

== Results ==
The returning officer, John Gillies, set the date of the nomination meeting for 28 March 1860, and if an election would become necessary, this was to be held on 11 April. John Richard Jones proposed and Charles Kettle seconded Thomas Gillies, the son of the returning officer. As this was the only person proposed, Gillies Jr. was declared elected unopposed.

Gillies represented the Dunedin Country electorate until the end of the term; parliament was dissolved on 5 November 1860 and the Dunedin Country electorate was abolished. Gillies was instead elected as a representative of the Bruce electorate in 1861. William Cargill died on 6 August 1860, less than a year after his resignation from parliament.
