= 1858 Dunedin Country by-election =

New Zealand by-election

- 16 June 1858
- Turnout: 119
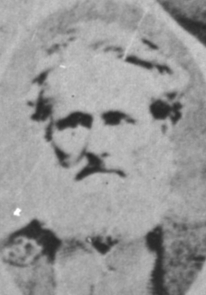
Candidate	John Parkin Taylor	Peter Napier
Party	Independent	Independent
Popular vote	73	46
Percentage	61.3%	38.7%
MP before election
John Cargill
Independent
Elected MP
John Taylor
Independent

The Dunedin Country by-election 1858 was a by-election held in the multi-member Dunedin Country electorate during the 2nd New Zealand Parliament, on 16 June 1858. The by-election was caused by the resignation of incumbent MP John Cargill and was won by John Taylor.

== Background ==
The Dunedin Country electorate was one of the original 24 parliamentary electorates of New Zealand from 1853, and it was one of the two-member electorates. John Cargill was one of the original representatives of the Dunedin Country electorate, and he again won election in 1855; the second representative in 1855 was his father, William Cargill. Cargill Jr. was one of many members of the House of Representatives who resigned prior to the second session of the 2nd New Zealand Parliament. The house had not been convened in 1857 and Cargill placed an advertisement in the Otago Witness on 12 September 1857, announcing his intention of handing in his resignation. At the opening of the second session of the 2nd Parliament on 10 April 1858, the speaker read out 14 resignations, including that of Cargill.

The Otago Witness discussed various potential candidates for the by-election prior to the nomination meeting. William Henry Teschemaker was known to have declined to be elected; he would later in the year be elected to Northern electorate of the Otago Provincial Council. The intentions of Alexander Chalmers were unknown. It was speculated that William Henry Valpy, Jr. would accept to be the representative. It was also known that John Taylor was interested in standing, but the Otago Witness had a strong dislike to him, as he frequently moved to new towns and had only been in Otago for a short time. A week later, the next edition of the Otago Witness discussed Taylor and Valpy as the only candidates who would contest the election; it was stated that both had no prior political experience. Valpy had, however, not offered himself for election, whilst Taylor had addressed the electors at a meeting. At the meeting, Taylor confirmed his political independence and inexperience:

I must, however, distinctly state that, as I have hitherto but very superficially studied New Zealand politics, if elected, I go to the Assembly entirely unfettered by any pledge, excepting to oppose Dr. Menzies' proposal for the division of the Province.

Dr Menzies was a settler near the later town of Wyndham, and he was the leader of the Southland separatist movement, the initiative to split the Southland Province off from the Otago Province.

== Nomination meeting ==
The nomination meeting was held at the Dunedin court house on Tuesday, 15 June at noon. John Gillies, the father of John Lillie Gillies, acted as the returning officer. John Taylor was proposed by Edward McGlashan and seconded by Dr William Purdie. As no other candidates were proposed, the returning officer was just about to declare Taylor elected unopposed when several electors asked to be informed of Taylor's political opinions, and questions to that effect were put to him. The returning officer was unsure how to proceed, when William Cutten proposed to nominate a pro forma candidate so that the candidates are given the opportunity to state their attitudes to important political questions. To that end, Cutten proposed and G. Smith seconded Peter Murdoch Napier, a runholder and one of the original explorers of the Maniototo.

Taylor and Napier then addressed the electors and answered questions. Their views differed on one issue only; whilst Napier favoured the introduction of the secret ballot, Taylor wanted to retain the status quo where electors would tell the returning officer their choice of favoured candidate, i.e. oral voting. Napier stated that he had not intended to be a candidate until proposed by Cutten. After a show of hands in favour of Taylor, Napier demanded a poll.

== Results ==
The poll was held the following day from 12 noon. Taylor won the Dunedin polling booth by 51 votes to 20. The results from the outlying polling booths came in the following day, and at 12 noon on Friday, 18 June 1858, the returning officer declared Taylor elected.

1858 Dunedin Country by-election
Party	Candidate	Votes	%	±%
Independent	John Taylor	73	61.3	
Independent	Peter Napier	46	38.7	
Turnout		119		
Majority		27		

Despite the promises that he made to the electors, Taylor assisted in bringing in the New Provinces Act, which constituted Southland as a separate provincial district. This brought him into conflict with many of his constituents, and he chose to retire from parliament at the end of the electoral term in 1860. The Dunedin Country electorate was abolished at the same time. The separation of Southland from the Otago Province went ahead in March 1861, and Menzies was elected its first Superintendent, succeeded by Taylor in 1865. The secret ballot was introduced in 1870, and first used in the 1871 election.
