= Bruce by-election =

Bruce by-election may refer to several by-elections in the history of the Bruce electorate in New Zealand:

- 1862 Bruce by-election
- April 1865 Bruce by-election
- July 1865 Bruce by-election
- 1870 Bruce by-election
- 1883 Bruce by-election
- 1885 Bruce by-election
- 1892 Bruce by-election
- 1920 Bruce by-election

There has also been one by-election in the Division of Bruce in Victoria, Australia:

- 1983 Bruce by-election
