= 1862 Bruce by-election =

New Zealand by-election

- 31 July 1862
- Turnout: 128
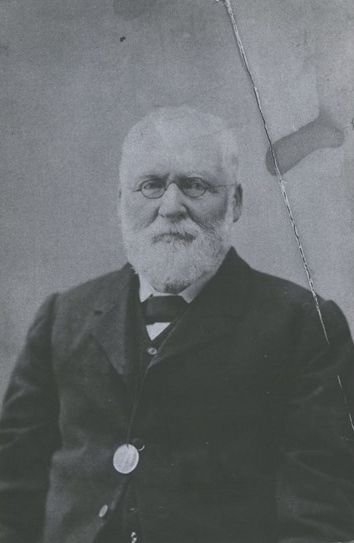
Candidate	Edward Cargill	William Baldwin
Party	Independent	Independent
Popular vote	74	54
Percentage	57.81%	42.19%
MP before election
Charles Kettle
Independent
Elected MP
Edward Cargill
Independent

The Bruce by-election 1862 was a by-election held in the multi-member Bruce electorate during the 3rd New Zealand Parliament, on 31 July 1862. The by-election was caused by the death of incumbent MP Charles Kettle on 5 June, and was won by Edward Cargill.

== Background ==
The Bruce electorate was formed in the 1860 electoral redistribution. It covered the rural area surrounding Dunedin that had previously been part of the Dunedin Country electorate. The Bruce electorate was a two-member constituency. Charles Kettle and Thomas Gillies were the initial representatives. Kettle died on 5 June 1862, and this caused the by-election. The Otago gold rush had started in May 1861 and the wider area experienced a significant increase in population, including the Bruce electorate. The lists of registered electors in several electorate, including Bruce, were revised during July 1862. The Miners' Representation Act, 1860 allowed miners to also vote under certain conditions, and they were not registered in lists; there were approximate 3,000 of them eligible in the Bruce electorate. It is thus not possible to say how many electors were qualified to vote in the by-election. Towards the end of June, it became known that William Baldwin, the gold fields commissioner at Waitahuna, would be a candidate in the by-election.

John Gillies, the father of Thomas Gillies, acted as the returning officer for the by-election, and he set the nomination meeting for Monday, 28 July at 12 noon. At that meeting, F. C. Fulton (a brother of James Fulton) proposed and Otago Provincial Councillor Andrew Todd seconded Baldwin. The second candidate, Edward Cargill, was proposed by William Reynolds and seconded by Johnny Jones, a former business partner of Cargill. The third person to be proposed was John Cargill, the brother of Edward Cargill, but this came as a surprise to the former who stated that he was not available for election. The two candidates then addressed the electors, and the obvious policy difference between them was that Baldwin was a proponent of separation of the South Island from the North Island, whilst Cargill supported one New Zealand. Julius Vogel, himself a strong proponent of the separation question, then put some hard questions to Cargill. The meeting finished with a show of hands in favour of Cargill (42 to 8 hands), and Baldwin demanded a poll.

== Results ==
Polling booths were in Dunedin at the court house, and at the school houses in East Taieri and Tokomairiro (since renamed to Milton), and Warepa (a locality near Balclutha). The election was held on Thursday, 31 July, between 9 am and 4 pm. By Saturday, 2 August, the Dunedin newspapers had not received the results from the Warepa booth, but Cargill was leading by 20 votes. The Warepa results were received later that morning, and the returning officer declared the official results that day. There were just two votes at Warepa, with one for each candidate, hence the majority did not change and Cargill was declared elected.

1862 Bruce by-election
Party	Candidate	Votes	%	±%
Independent	Edward Cargill	74	57.81	
Independent	William Baldwin	54	42.19	
Turnout		128		
Majority		20		

Cargill represented the Bruce electorate until 1865, when he resigned. He was succeeded by James Macandrew in the July 1865 by-election. Baldwin was elected in the 1863 supplementary election in the Gold Fields electorate.
