= Edward Cargill =

New Zealand businessman and politician

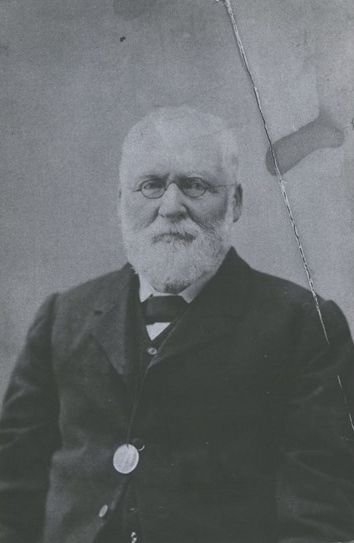
- Portrait of Edward Cargill

Member of the New Zealand Parliament for Bruce
- In office 31 July 1862 – 21 June 1865
- Preceded by: Charles Kettle
- Succeeded by: James Macandrew

23rd Mayor of Dunedin
- In office 1897–1898
- Preceded by: Hugh Gourley
- Succeeded by: William Swan

Personal details
- Born: 9 October 1823 Edinburgh, Scotland
- Died: 9 August 1903 (aged 79) Dunedin, New Zealand
- Spouse: Dorothy Nesham (m. 1854; died 1889)
- Relations: William Cargill (father); John Cargill (brother); Isabel Cargill (daughter); Francis Petre (son-in-law)
- Children: 5
- Profession: businessman, politician

Edward Bowes Cargill (9 October 1823 – 9 August 1903) was a 19th-century businessman and Member of Parliament in Dunedin, Otago, New Zealand. He was the Mayor of Dunedin from 1897 to 1898.

== Early life ==
Cargill was born in Edinburgh, Scotland, in 1823; he was the seventh son of William Cargill, one of Otago's most prominent settlers. John Cargill was an elder brother. Edward Cargill was educated in Edinburgh and, after the family moved to England, at Norwich Grammar School and at Perone's School. He went to sea from age 14 and visited Australia and the Far East. In 1844, he settled in Ceylon and worked for the Bank of Western India. He was then a merchant in Ceylon and was in various partnerships. Cargill then went to Melbourne in Australia, where he stayed from 1855 to 1857 an importer of Eastern goods.

== Life in New Zealand ==
Cargill moved to Dunedin in New Zealand - his father had previously moved there in 1847. He was initially in a partnership with Johnny Jones as a merchant and ship owner. They dissolved their partnership in 1861 and he partnered with his brother John. Their business prospered due to the Otago gold rush, but their premises burned down twice (in late 1861 and in early 1864). The business expanded and many ships were bought, but Cargill made significant losses during the recession in the 1880s, which caused him to retire from business in 1889.

== Political career ==
New Zealand Parliament
Years	Term	Electorate	Party
1862–1865	3rd	Bruce	Independent

Cargill represented the Bruce electorate from 1862 to 1865, when he resigned. He represented the Western electorate on the Otago Provincial Council (24 February 1862 – 7 February 1862), and represented the Town of Dunedin electorate for two terms (22 May 1863 – 10 January 1867; 13 March 1871 – 13 March 1873). He was twice on the Executive Council of Otago Province and served as Provincial Secretary (19 August 1863 – 15 September 1863; 13 April 1871 – 2 June 1871). He was on the University of Otago board. He contested the 1887 election in the Dunedin Central electorate, but was beaten by Frederick Fitchett.

He was the Mayor of Dunedin from 1897 to 1898, when the 50th anniversary of the founding of the province of Otago was celebrated.

== Home and family ==
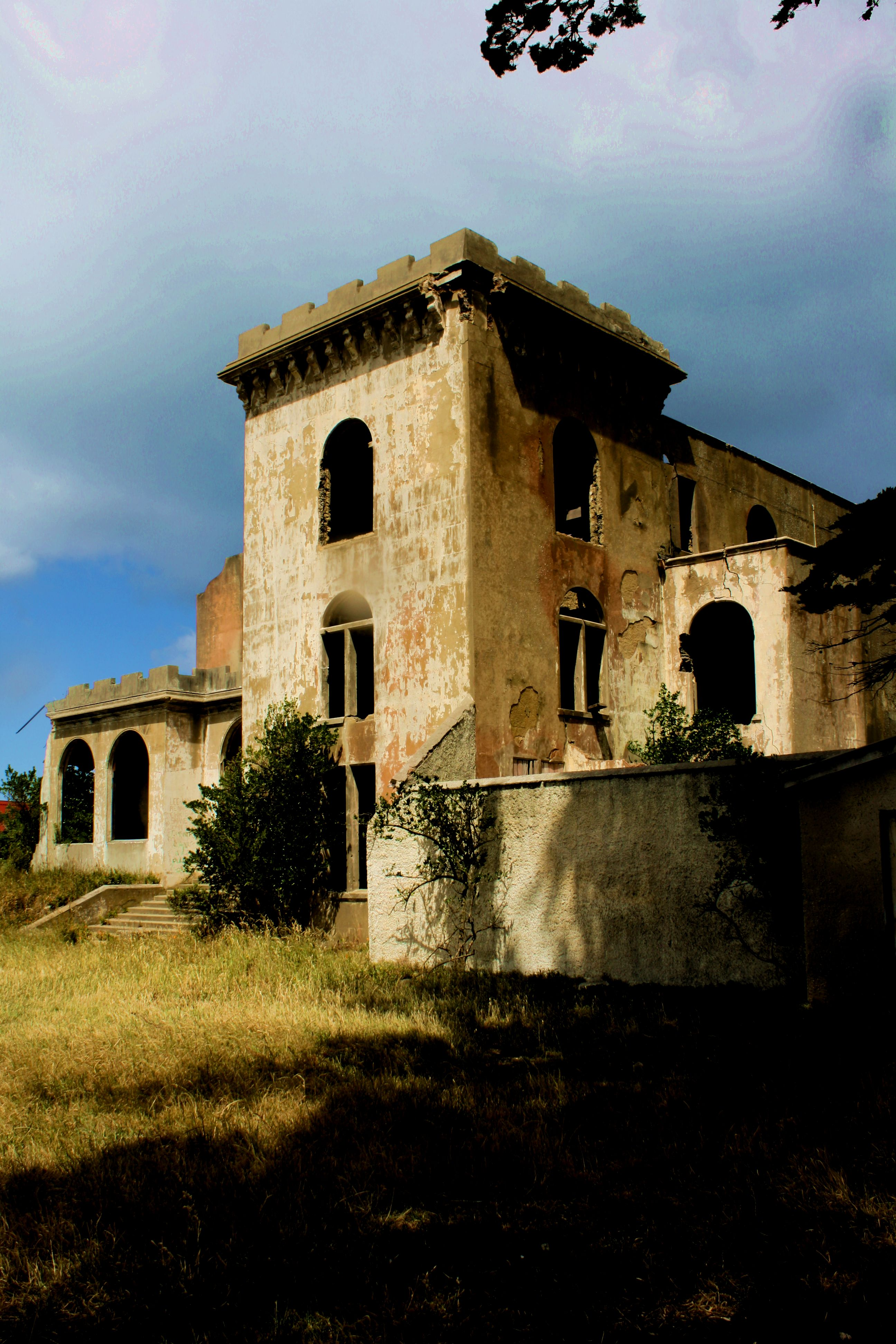
Cargill's Castle in 2009

In 1854, Cargill married Dorothy Nesham, and the couple went on to have five daughters. Dorothy Cargill died in 1889.

Cargill had built as his home the distinctive Cargill's Castle in Dunedin, known originally as "The Cliffs". Several kilometres south of the castle is Tunnel Beach, so named because this quiet beach is only accessible through a steeply sloping tunnel cut into the 60 metres (200 ft) high cliffs by the Cargill family. The house was designed by Francis Petre, at the time a young architect; it is also very likely that Petre was the supervisor of the construction of the tunnel. While designing the house, Petre fell in love with Cargill's daughter Margaret. After a difficult courtship (due to Petre's staunch Catholicism and the Cargill family's equally staunch Presbyterianism) the couple were eventually permitted to marry, the wedding taking place in the villa's principal salon on 1 March 1881.

Cargill's daughter Isabel Cargill travelled to Italy with Ann Marie Babington and in 1893 they opened Babington's tea room on the Spanish Steps in Rome which still today belongs to her descendants.

Cargill died on 9 August 1903. He was buried at Dunedin Southern Cemetery.

== Notes ==
New Zealand Parliament
Preceded by Charles Kettle	Member of Parliament for Bruce; 1862–1865; Served alongside: Thomas Gillies, Arthur John Burns	Succeeded by James Macandrew
Political offices
Preceded by Hugh Gourley	Mayor of Dunedin; 1897–1898	Succeeded by William Swan
