= John Parkin Taylor =

New Zealand politician (1812–1875)

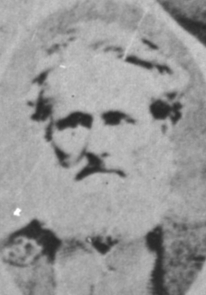
- John Parkin Taylor in 1860

2nd Superintendent of Southland Province
- In office 13 March 1865 – 7 September 1869
- Preceded by: James Alexander Robertson Menzies
- Succeeded by: William Wood

Member of the New Zealand Parliament for Dunedin Country
- In office 16 June 1858 – 5 November 1860
- Preceded by: John Cargill
- Succeeded by: electorate abolished

Personal details
- Born: 1812 Treeton, England
- Died: 12 August 1875 (aged 63) Riverton, New Zealand
- Resting place: Riverton Cemetery
- Spouse: Ismene Taylor
- Occupation: runholder, politician

John Parkin Taylor (1812 – 12 August 1875) was a 19th-century New Zealand runholder, and a politician in Otago and Southland. In his early life, Taylor lived in various countries and studied languages in Germany. He worked as a merchant and was married when he returned to England. Taylor's family emigrated to New Zealand in 1849 and he was a sheep farmer in various parts of the South Island before finally settling on a run near Riverton in Southland, where he had his homestead 'Waldeck' built. He entered the House of Representatives for the Dunedin Country electorate through a by-election in 1858 but fell out with many of his constituents over a broken election promise, as he helped the Southland Province to break away from the Otago Province. He eventually became Southland's second Superintendent and served from 1865 to 1869, and also represented an electorate on the Southland Provincial Council for a few months. In 1865, he was appointed to the New Zealand Legislative Council and with one break in membership due to non-attendance, he remained a member until his death. He served for one year as mayor of Riverton (1872–73) but did not stand again due to poor health. Taylor had a painful illness and died in 1875.

== Early life ==
Taylor was born in Treeton near Rotherham, England, in 1812. After his education, he worked as a merchant in Liverpool (England), Havana (Cuba), and then Germany. In the latter country, he studied languages and gained an appreciation of German literature. He went back to England, settled in Rotherham, went into business there, and married Ismene De Chapte.

== Life in New Zealand ==
New Zealand Parliament
Years	Term	Electorate	Party
1858–1860	2nd	Dunedin Country	Independent

Taylor's family emigrated to Nelson, New Zealand in 1849 on the Cornwall, which reached Nelson Harbour on 25 August. He remained on board to travel to Otago for land exploration. Having bought land in the Awatere Valley sheep farming proved uneconomic and Taylor moved south, leaving his family in Nelson. He bought land in circa 1853 just north of the Waitaki River; the Waikakahi run was later known as Elephant Hill. Taylor sold the run in 1855 and took up run 28 at Otekaike, on the south side of the Waitaki River and inland from Duntroon. In 1856, he bought the Waiau run (run 165), located between the Waiau and Wairaki Rivers in Southland, from Charles Whybrow Ligar. He sold his northern land holdings, moved his stock over land to his new run, and sent for his family to come down from Nelson. He reached his new land in July 1856, and built a homestead 'Waldeck' near Riverton. He entertained at his homestead and it became an important meeting point.

The resignation of incumbent MP John Cargill caused the 1858 Dunedin Country by-election. Taylor addressed the electors at a meeting, where he confirmed his political independence and inexperience:

I must, however, distinctly state that, as I have hitherto but very superficially studied New Zealand politics, if elected, I go to the Assembly entirely unfettered by any pledge, excepting to oppose Dr. Menzies' proposal for the division of the Province.

Dr Menzies was a settler near the later town of Wyndham, and he was the leader of the Southland separatist movement, the initiative to split the Southland Province off from the Otago Province. Taylor won the election, but despite the promises that he made to the electors, Taylor assisted in bringing in the New Provinces Act, which constituted Southland as a separate provincial district. This brought him into conflict with many of his constituents, and he chose to retire from parliament at the end of the electoral term in 1860.

He was elected Superintendent of Southland Province twice; first in March 1865 and then in September 1867. He served until the dissolution of the second term in September 1869. He also represented the Cambelltown electorate on the Southland Provincial Council for three months in 1869. Taylor, Arthur Seymour, John Acland, James Crowe Richmond, James Rolland, James Prendergast, Henry Miller, Henry Coote and Alfred Rowland Chetham-Strode were all appointed to the Legislative Council on 8 July 1865. Taylor's membership lapsed on 18 October 1867 through absence. He was reappointed on 4 July 1868 and served until his death on 12 August 1875. On 17 July 1872, Taylor was declared elected mayor of Riverton as his opponent had failed to sign the nomination form. A year later, Taylor was too ill to stand for re-election.

== Family ==
Taylor was ill for a long time and after much pain, he died on 12 August 1875 at his homestead Waldeck, aged 63. After Henry Coote (1819–1867) and Joseph Hawdon (1813–1871), he was only the third member to have left the Legislative Council through death. He was buried at Riverton Cemetery. His wife moved to Invercargill, and when she died in 1878, she was buried next to him.

Taylor's only daughter, Phoebe Ann Bertha Taylor, had married Captain Edward Mitford Hankinson, RN, on 7 April 1870 at Riverton, with the reception at Waldeck. After Taylor's death, his son-in-law's family lived at Waldeck, where Captain Hankinson died in 1884. Taylor's sons were James Corie Taylor, who committed suicide in Wellington on 17 November 1879, and Robert Charles Taylor, who died at Little River on 8 February 1917. His daughter, after having remarried (to James Young), died at Invercargill on 5 September 1917.

== Notes ==
Political offices
Preceded by James Alexander Robertson Menzies	Superintendent of Southland Province; 1865–1869	Succeeded by William Wood
New Zealand Parliament
Preceded by John Cargill	Member of Parliament for Dunedin Country; 1858–1860; Served alongside: William Cargill, Thomas Gillies	Constituency abolished
