= James Menzies (New Zealand politician) =

Superintendent of Southland Province (1821–1888)

The Honourable James Menzies
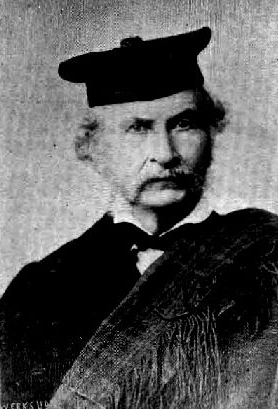

1st Superintendent of Southland Province
- In office 3 August 1861 – 13 January 1865
- Succeeded by: John Parkin Taylor

Personal details
- Born: James Alexander Robertson Menzies; 21 February 1821 Mount Alexander (Dunalistair), Perthshire, Scotland
- Died: 18 August 1888 (aged 67) Wyndham, New Zealand
- Spouse: Laetitia Anne Featherston (m. 1865)
- Children: 5
- Relatives: Isaac Featherston (father-in-law)
- Occupation: Doctor; Runholder

James Alexander Robertson Menzies (21 February 1821 – 18 August 1888) was the first superintendent of the Southland Province in New Zealand from 3 August 1861 to November 1864, during its breakaway from Otago Province (1861 to 1870). He continued serving on the Provincial Council after his superintendency ended.

During Menzies' tenure as superintendent, two railways projects were undertaken, a railway to link Invercargill to the port at Bluff and a wooden railway to Winton. The former is now known as the Bluff Branch, while as the wooden rails were unsatisfactory they were replaces with "standard" steel rails, and the line was extended to ultimately form the Kingston Branch. Menzies, now in disagreement with his colleagues, retired to his 8000-acre estate near Wyndham.

Menzies served on the Legislative Council for 30 years, from 1858 until his death in 1888, and promoted the interests of Southland.

== See also ==
- Southland, New Zealand

Political offices
New office	Superintendent of Southland Province; 1861–1864	Succeeded by John Parkin Taylor
