= 1885 Bruce by-election =

New Zealand by-election

The 1885 Bruce by-election was a by-election held on 5 August 1885 in the Bruce electorate during the 9th New Zealand Parliament.

The by-election was held after the resignation of Robert Gillies for health reasons. He had won the seat at the general 1884 election.

He was replaced by Donald Reid.

The runner-up James McDonald had represented Bruce up to the 1884 election. A former representative of the Bruce electorate, William Murray, was invited to contest the by-election but he declined.

J. C. Anderson was born in Bruce and had farmed there for thirteen years.

William Hutchison wrote that he had "many pleasant memories" of the electorate but another correspondent said it was a "very palpable defeat" and denied that the Kaitangata miners were told how to vote.

== Results ==
The following table gives the election result:

1885 Bruce by-election
Party	Candidate	Votes	%	±%
Independent	Donald Reid	336	31.61	
Independent	James McDonald	327	30.76	
Independent	Crawford Anderson	303	28.50	
Independent	William Hutchison	97	9.13	
Majority		9	0.85	
Turnout		1063		
