= 1870 Mongonui by-election =

New Zealand by-election

The 1870 Mongonui by-election was a by-election held on 30 March 1870 in the Mongonui electorate during the 4th New Zealand Parliament.

The by-election was caused by the resignation of the incumbent MP Thomas Ball on 1 March 1870. The by-election was won by Thomas Gillies.

== Results ==
The following table gives the election result:

1870 Mongonui by-election
Party	Candidate	Votes	%	±%
Independent	Thomas Gillies	28	54.90	
Independent	John Lundon	23	45.10	
Majority		5	9.80	
Turnout		51		
