= Bluff Branch =

Railway line in New Zealand

The Bluff Branch, officially the Bluff Line since 2011, is a railway line in Southland, New Zealand that links Invercargill with the port of Bluff. One of the first railways in New Zealand, it opened on 5 February 1867 and is still operating. Presently, it essentially functions as an elongated industrial siding.

Map

== Construction ==
In the early days of New Zealand's colonisation, transport between Bluff and Invercargill was through sometimes impassable swampy terrain. Construction of a road to Bluff (called Campbelltown until March 1917) was approved by the Otago Provincial Council in 1859, but the swamp defeated the builders. Southland Province split from Otago in 1861, partially over disputes over infrastructure spending. The new council under Superintendent James Menzies considered a railway as an alternative to the road. In November 1862 the provincial council decided on building the "Bluff Harbour & Invercargill Railway". On 8 August 1863 "Lady Barkly", the first locomotive to steam in New Zealand, ran on a small section of track on Invercargill Jetty, and a 12 kilometres (7.5 mi) line from Invercargill to Makarewa (today part of the Ohai Branch) opened on 18 October 1864, built with wooden rails, as an apparently cheaper alternative to iron rails. The same year construction of a line to Bluff began.

In 1866 the failure of the wooden rails used on the Invercargill-Makarewa section of what became the Kingston Branch became apparent, and the decision was made to use iron rails to Bluff and convert the Makarewa section to iron rails. Originally thought to be of reasonable cost to construct, the line soon proved otherwise.

The line was built to the international standard gauge of 1,435 mm (4 ft 8.5 in), the railway followed standard British method of keeping the line on a level grade as much as possible. Construction from the Invercargill Harbour and Wharf area soon became troublesome with the direct route across the New River estuary proving difficult due to the deep swampy mud needing to be piled up with rocks and hardwood poles.

The line made it to Clifton and easier ground as the raised formation skirted the banks of the east arm of the estuary passing over the Waimatua Creek. At the start of the Awarua plains, yet again swampy ground caused delays as large embankments and a sizeable bridge were needed to cross the tidal Mokotua Stream at Wards Crossing. Spoil taken from a large cutting at Woodend, to keep the line level, assisted in creating the embankments. After Awarua the line had it easy-going until the upper reaches of Bluff Harbour where costly large stone causeways were constructed to take the line around the Ocean Beach neck and onto the Bluff peninsula. A quarry nearby was used for material needed. Helping with the construction, a small branch line was laid to the Mokomoko inlet jetty with coastal shipping off-loading supplies.

=== Controversial opening ===
The line opened on 5 February 1867 after a delay caused by the Southland Provincial Council going bankrupt due to the high cost of building both this line and a wooden railway northwards to Makarewa (later part of the Kingston Branch). During the last phases of building, the line was blocked at Greenhills by angry contractors who were still to be paid for work done on the large causeways that carried the line down the upper Bluff harbour. The local Sheriff seized all assets on the line, a form of receivership enacted, allowing the finishing off work to continue. The situation was resolved when the Otago Provincial Council, as well as the Central Government, absorbed the debt incurred with the passage of the Southland Provincial Debt Act 1865. The province was re-absorbed into Otago on 6 October 1870.

=== Kew diversion ===
The formation and bridges that crossed the upper New River estuary continued to cause trouble with the line formation sinking and making the journey uncomfortable for travellers. It was decided to divert the line around the estuary foreshore from what is today the Crinan St level crossing, paralleling the Bluff Highway around past the Kew Bush area and meeting up with the line at Clifton. This was completed in 1872. This route would later be of benefit to the future Seaward Bush/Tokanui branch line that ran parallel to the Bluff line from Invercargill station to south of Clyde Street station where the two lines parted company. So the station at Clyde Street had two single-track railways running through it, giving a false impression of double track. When the Tokanui branch closed, the parallel line was taken out of use, and points were installed at Clyde Street for access to the branch by work trains during the lifting of the track.

Little remains of the harbour crossing and Invercargill Wharf due to draining and substantial land reclamation over 100 years, some bridge piles are still visible.

=== Regauged ===
In 1870, the central government took effective control of railway development from the provinces of New Zealand. To unify all rail systems operating in the colony, and to ease the cost of construction, the national rail gauge was set at a narrow gauge of 1,067 mm (3 ft 6.0 in). The Bluff Branch was converted to this gauge in a single day, 18 December 1875. The original standard gauge locomotives and rolling stock retreating to the Bluff wharf and then loaded onto the Cezarewitch and sent to New South Wales, although the locomotives and rolling stock never made it, being wrecked at Big Bay, West Coast.

== Mokomoko Harbour Branch ==
During the construction phase of the Bluff Branch, contractors found that landing urgent supplies at the Invercargill wharf could prove difficult due to the worsening danger of the New River estuary silting up dangerous sand bars. Contractors were having a difficult time building over and around the upper reaches of the estuary and getting equipment into the area proved troublesome. At the mouth of the estuary was the moderately deep and weather-sheltered entry to the Mokomoko inlet. A Jetty already existed at the eastern side of the inlet entrance for the local settlers and at one point was promoted as an alternative to both Campbelltown and Invercargill's port ambitions. It was decided to lay a spur line off the still incomplete Bluff mainline to the jetty which consisted of a large curve that required deep drains on each side. The junction points faced Awarua with a small flag station controlling the points.

The branch was only ever useful as a supply line and few passengers were carried, mainly from the small coastal steamers that would land at the jetty instead of risking the voyage up to Invercargill. When the new wharf at Bluff Harbour opened, the Mokomoko jetty fell into disuse. The railway remained until a change of gauge day on 18 December 1875 when it was decided to close the line instead of re-gauging it. The rails were taken up and used elsewhere.

== Operation ==
Bluff established itself as the port of Southland and the line has always been busy with both inbound and outbound freight. Major railway facilities were built around the original town wharf site with most servicing equipment moving to the new and substantial Island Harbour port, built from 1956 and opening in December 1960. When containerisation was introduced and freight transportation trends changed, Bluff was not selected to be developed as a container port, but it and the railway have remained busy with traffic such as frozen meat, wool, and wood chips. In more recent years a degree of containerisation has taken place with the port investing in mobile crane and straddler facilities, rail playing a predominant role in moving containers from the large private container distribution centre located at Clifton. In 2016 a new port owned multimodal distribution centre was completed on an unused area of the Invercargill railway yards next to the Bluff Line entrance. The port company favouring rail as its wharf to centre transportation solution.

=== Station ===
As with all colonial transport facilities over time, Bluff station started with a rudimentary class 5 station until growing into an impressive two-story George Troup designed edifice befitting of the southernmost railway station in the British Empire.

For many years, passenger traffic on the line was heavy, with 12,000 fares travelling in a single day to a regatta in Bluff on 1 January 1900. Development of modern road networks and private cars caused passenger numbers to decline from the 1930s. In 1929 the Clayton steam railcar was used on the line to provide passenger services, but it was withdrawn in 1930 due to the Great Depression. The 1950 public timetable showed seven-weekday services each way, with an eighth on Fridays; five on Saturdays; and one on Sundays. This declined starkly over the following years, and by 1964, only one passenger train ran each way on weekdays and none at weekends. The remaining service was operated for school children, running from Bluff to Invercargill in the morning and returning in the late afternoon. In 1967, all passenger services were cancelled. The station was run down and used as surplus storage until a fire damaged it in 1970, promptly demolished after. Passenger trains briefly returned when the Kingston Flyer operated some services to Bluff between 1979 and 1982.

=== Locomotives ===
Steam locomotives used on the line were mainly restricted to the lightweight U and Q class along with smaller tank locomotives such as W^{A}, W^{F}, F and D classes. The reason being the only turning facilities at Bluff was the "Wye" layout that was part of the wharf's lighter rail access bridges. Only the tank locomotives could use the wharf trackage and they were assisted by a capstan winch system that could pull wagons into position under ship's cranes, Bluff town wharf never having cranes. The small shunters would also assist with handling rakes of wagons to and from the Ocean Beach freezing works.

Locomotives were serviced at a modest two road depot located at the northern end of the station yard although, apart from the wharf shunters, only one mainline locomotive remained overnight to head the first early 5:00 a.m. mixed train to Invercargill.

By the 1960s, most trains between Invercargill and Bluff were in charge of A^{B} and J^{A} class locomotives, the latter were regular performers on the school trains until their demise.

== Island Harbour ==
In the early 1950s, New Zealand was basking in a large economic boom period and modernisation around the country was taking place. Southland was at the forefront of a major agricultural export boom and the now ageing town wharf simply couldn't cope with the heavy demands of rail traffic and busy shipping causing it.

The Harbour Board decided to build an island harbour facility that could handle the then latest bulk meat loading methods. This new island construction was begun in 1952. The island would have a substantial rail network built on it, and it is connected to the mainland by a combined road/rail bridge (road alongside rail). Island Harbour opened for traffic on 3 December 1960.

=== Station and working yards ===
After the construction of the Island Harbour in 1960, the larger A^{B}, J and J^{A} mainline locomotives were used as the new facility was built on solid ground. The junction points to the new port facility faced Invercargill to allow direct access for mainline train movements. A small signal box controlled the junction handling trains from the original town station. A new Bluff Station crew and loco depot with a turning Wye was built (instead of a turntable) on the island. This also housed the diesel-powered Hunslet DSA class shunters, which also shunted the town side railyards and what was now called the Town Wharf. Mainline locomotives returned to Invercargill with the last train every day.

The huge Ocean Beach freezing works was also shunted by the Bluff-based shunters. Frozen meat from other works around the region were also handled through the port, creating substantial rail traffic for the branch. A then unique all-weather meat loading facility allowed for trains to be shunted directly into a large five-bay shed with overhead conveyor loaders carrying frozen carcasses out of wagons and directly into a ship's hold.

== Rationalisation ==
When the Ocean Beach freezing works closed in 1989 and bulk shipping of frozen meat methods changed to containerisation in the 1990s, most of the town side rail yards and sidings, including the old wharf rails were lifted. The last of many level crossings into warehouses along Gore Street, Bluff's main street, were removed in 1990.

A substantial drop in rail traffic has resulted as Southland moved from sheep meat-based farming to dairy. Shipping patterns also changed, with bulk commodities taking over.

Minimal trackage on the town's station site remains to serve the substantial cool stores located along Gore Street. This also includes the southern tip of the KiwiRail network. Beautification work along the old railway yards has created a park-like setting. The only substantial structures are now the station goods shed and a re-positioned wagon turntable to represent the numerous former level crossings on Gore Street. Some rails to warehouses remain in situ at old entrances.

The Island Harbour's locomotive depot was closed in 1999, with all shunting and train handling controlled from Invercargill. The locomotive turning wye was taken out of use shortly after. Rail facilities were rationalised to suit log and container handling after the all-weather meat loading facilities were decommissioned in 2000. All pier-side rail activity was ended in 2010 because of new government safety laws.

Rail access to the old Ocean Beach freezing works was removed in 2016, eliminating the level crossing over State Highway 1.

=== Modern locomotive power ===
Mainline diesel power arrived on the Bluff Branch in the mid-1960s, sharing the line with steam power until 1970. After a trial with the heavy DG class diesel locomotives, services were operated by DJ class locomotives after their introduction in 1968 on account of their lower axle-load. The DE class heavy shunting locomotive also worked the line on lighter transfer work. Following the withdrawal of the DJ class in the late 1980s and after the structural strengthening of bridges, both DBR and DC class locomotives were used. The DF and DX classes were occasional visitors with larger trains. Shunting power remained the preserve of the DSA class until the larger, twin-engine, DSC class shunters arrived in 1988. In recent years the predominant motive power has been the Invercargill-based high powered DSG class shunters, which also serve the large Balance Agri-Nutri phosphate works at Awarua's Wards Crossing.

=== 2000s–2010s ===
In 2000 the line was downgraded to industrial shunt status to save day-to-day operating administration costs. One-train-at-a-time operations are the norm south of Clifton, although the crossing loop at Wards Crossing allows for two train operation on Traffic Warrant Control.

The level crossing into the Phosphate Works at Wards Crossing is still active with regular shunting services. It is the southernmost level crossing on State Highway 1.

The new inland SouthPort multimodal container terminal located on a portion of the Invercargill railway yard has returned considerable tonnage to the line. Regular maintenance of the line including sleeper replacement has allowed for heavier tare weight wagons to now operate over it.

Passenger excursions still are a regular feature on the line, although passenger handling facilities are non-existent and tender-first operations are necessary for steam locomotives as they are unable to be turned. In any case, any through train to the Bluff line from the main line to the north has always required reversal at Invercargill, as trains off both lines are facing north on arrival there.

Apart from wayside stations closing, the line has needed no major reconstruction work mainly because of the legacy of its excellent, if somewhat costly, 19th-century British railway construction methods.

== See also ==
- Main South Line
- Kingston Branch
- Browns/Hedgehope Branch
- Seaward Bush/Tokanui Branch
- Tuatapere & Orawia Branches
- Wairio/Ohai Branch
