= Dunedin Country =

Dunedin Country was a parliamentary electorate in the rural area surrounding the city of Dunedin in Otago, New Zealand, from 1853 to 1860. It was a two-member electorate and was represented by a total of five members of parliament.

== Population centres ==
The New Zealand Constitution Act 1852, passed by the British government, allowed New Zealand to establish a representative government. The initial 24 New Zealand electorates were defined by Governor George Grey in March 1853. Dunedin Country was one of the initial two-member electorates. The electorate covered the Otago Province in its entirety with the exclusion of Dunedin, which was represented through the Town of Dunedin electorate. The area was sparsely populated, but during its existence, Invercargill was laid out in 1856.

The Constitution Act also allowed the House of Representatives to establish new electorates, and this was first done in 1858, when four new electorates were formed by splitting existing electorates. Wallace was one of those four electorates, and it was established by splitting the Dunedin Country electorate.

In the 1860 electoral redistribution, the Dunedin Country electorate was abolished, and its area split between the Wallace, Bruce, and Hampden electorates.

== History ==
Three people were nominated for the first election in 1853, but only William Cutten and John Cargill accepted the nomination. Edward McGlashan stated that he was not available to represent the electorate. The returning officer therefore declared Cutten and Cargill elected. Cutten resigned in 1855 before the end of the term of the term of the 1st New Zealand Parliament citing business pressure; no by-election was held. John Cargill and his father William were elected unopposed on 11 December 1855 for the 2nd New Zealand Parliament. John and William resigned in 1858 and October 1859, respectively. The first vacancy was filled by John Parkin Taylor, who retired from parliament at the end of this term. The second vacancy was filled by Thomas Gillies, who was declared elected unopposed.

=== Members of Parliament ===
The electorate was represented by five members of parliament.

Election	Winners	
1853 election	William Cutten	John Cargill
1855 election	William Cargill	John Cargill
1858 by-election	William Cargill	John Parkin Taylor
1860 by-election	Thomas Gillies	John Parkin Taylor
(Electorate abolished 1860; see Wallace, Bruce, and Hampden)

== Election results ==
Only one election in the Dunedin Country electorate was contested. At the two general elections and the 1860 by-election, the candidates were declared elected unopposed.

=== 1858 by-election ===
1858 Dunedin Country by-election
Party	Candidate	Votes	%	±%
Independent	John Taylor	73	61.3	
Independent	Peter Napier	46	38.7	
Turnout		119		
Majority		27		
