= Isabel Cargill =

New Zealand businesswoman

- Born: December 10, 1864; Dunedin, Otago, New Zealand
- Died: April 17, 1944 (aged 79); Stra, Veneto, Italy
- Occupation: Businesswoman
- Known for: Co-founder of Babington's Tea Room
- Spouse: Giuseppe da Pozzo (m. 1902)
- Children: Dorothy (b. 1904)
- Parent(s): Edward Cargill and Dorothy Nesham
- Relatives: William Cargill (grandfather)

Isabel Cargill (10 December 1864 – 17 April 1944) was a New Zealand businesswoman who established English-style tearooms in Rome, Italy, in the early 1890s. She is best known as the co-founder of Babington's Tea Room in Rome, established in 1893 with her friend Anna Maria Babington.

== Biography ==
Cargill was born in Dunedin, New Zealand, on 10 December 1864. She was the granddaughter of William Cargill, the founder of the city, and the fourth daughter of Edward Cargill and his wife, Dorothy Cargill (née Nesham).

In the early 1890s she travelled to England and then, with her English friend Anna Maria Babington, to Italy. When they were unable to find a shop selling cups of tea in the city, the pair decided to open an English-style tearooms, which they called Babington's Tea Room.

Cargill also wrote a column, "Letters from Rome" for the Otago Witness newspaper.

In 1902, Cargill married an Italian artist, Giuseppe da Pozzo. The couple had one daughter, Dorothy, who was born in 1904.

Cargill died in Stra, Veneto, Italy, on 17 April 1944.

== Legacy ==
Babington's Tea Room continues to operate in its original location near the Spanish Steps in Rome. It remains a cultural landmark, known for preserving English tea traditions in Italy and attracting visitors from around the world.

== Writings ==
Cargill contributed a regular column titled "Letters from Rome" to the Otago Witness newspaper, offering New Zealand readers insights into Italian society, culture, and daily life from her perspective as an expatriate in Rome.
