= John Hyde Harris =

New Zealand politician

The Honourable John Hyde Harris
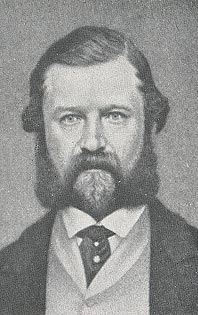

4th Superintendent of Otago Province
- In office 1863–1865

2nd Mayor of Dunedin
- In office 1867–1868

Member of the New Zealand Legislative Council
- In office 1858–1864
- In office 1867–1868

Personal details
- Born: 24 November 1826 Deddington, Oxfordshire, England
- Died: 24 July 1886 (aged 59) Dunedin, Otago, New Zealand
- Spouses: Annie Cunningham Cargill (m. 1851; died 1881) Kate Philomena Dunphy (m. 1881)
- Relations: William Cargill (father-in-law); William Cutten (brother-in-law)
- Children: three daughters and six sons
- Profession: Lawyer, judge, run holder, politician

John Hyde Harris (24 November 1826 – 24 July 1886) was a 19th-century New Zealand politician. Born in England, he came to Dunedin as a young man and practised as a lawyer, and was then a judge. He entered provincial politics and was elected as the fourth Superintendent of the Otago Province. He then became Mayor of Dunedin and was called to the Legislative Council. He played one first-class cricket match during the 1865–66 season.

== Early life ==
Harris was born in 1826 in Deddington, Oxfordshire, England. (Note: Some sources say 1825.) His parents were John Harris and Ann (née Hyde). He trained in law and came out to New Zealand in September 1850, arriving in Dunedin on the Poictiers.

== Private life in New Zealand ==
Harris married Annie Cunningham Cargill in Dunedin on 3 September 1851. She was the daughter of William Cargill, who was to become the first Superintendent of Otago in 1853. Harris and Cargill had different political views, but Harris often agreed with William Cutten, who was married to another of Cargill's daughters. Annie Cunningham died on 18 January 1881, aged 51. They had three daughters and six sons.

Harris remarried on 3 November 1881, to Kate Philomena Dunphy, daughter of William Wallis Dunphy.

== Professional life ==
After his arrival in Dunedin, Harris practised as a lawyer for several years and was in partnership first with John Gillies and, in addition, since July 1857 with his son Thomas Gillies. In 1858, he was appointed judge at the District Court and he held that position until 1862 when the office was abolished.

Harris speculated with land. He had extensive holdings in Waihola, Otokia (south-west of Mosgiel), Lee Stream (inland from Outram), and West Taieri. He lost £28,000 over a four-year period and this was a major reason for his resignation in 1865 from the Superintendency.

After his political career had finished, he continued working in the legal profession. He never recovered from his financial losses and was even imprisoned for one year for his debts.

== Political career ==
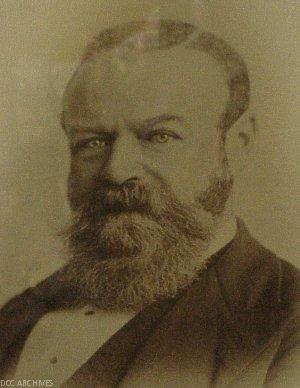
John Harris in 1867

Harris was elected onto the Otago Provincial Council in September 1853. In the first council (1853–1855), he was a member of the Dunedin Country electorate and represented the interests of Port Chalmers. In the second council (1855–1858), he was a member of the Town of Dunedin electorate. He was a member of the executive in 1858–59. In 1862, he was elected Deputy-Superintend for Otago Province. He was Superintendent of Otago Province from 16 April 1863 until his resignation on 23 June 1865. He claimed significant differences in opinion with his executive, as well as a need to devote more time to his private financial affairs, as reasons for his resignation.

During his Superintendency, he championed the first New Zealand Exhibition and was its chairman when it was held in Dunedin in 1865.

In 1867, he contested the Dunedin mayoralty. There were four candidates running for the second time that the mayor was elected. Harris, James Turner, Thomas Birch and John Millar received 340, 273, 200 and 101 votes, respectively. He served for one term and was succeeded in 1868 by Thomas Birch.

He was twice called to the Legislative Council. His first term was from 1858 to 1864. During his second term from 1867 to 1868, he was a member of the second Stafford Ministry (from 9 September 1867), holding the role of Solicitor-General from 26 October 1867 until 13 May 1868.

Harris was a man of influence and standing in the community. According to Bernard Foster, if it had not been for his financial difficulties, Harris "would probably have played an even more important part in provincial and colonial politics".

== Cricket ==
Harris played cricket for Otago, appearing first for the side in a February 1864 match against a touring English side let by George Parr at the Dunedin Oval. The following season he played in the only first-class match played in New Zealand during 1864–65, a February 1865 match against Canterbury. He did not score a run in either match.

== Death ==
Harris died in Dunedin on 24 July 1886, aged 59 years. He is buried in the Northern Cemetery.

== Notes ==
Political offices
Preceded by John Richardson	Superintendent of Otago Province; 1863–1865	Succeeded by Thomas Dick
Preceded by William Mason	Mayor of Dunedin; 1867–1868	Succeeded by Thomas Birch
