= Crawford Anderson =

New Zealand politician

New Zealand Parliament
Years	Term	Electorate	Party
1887–1890	10th	Bruce	Independent

John Crawford Anderson (c. 1848 – 12 November 1930) was a 19th-century Member of Parliament in Otago, New Zealand.

== Early life ==
Anderson was born about 1848 at Maori Kaik on Otago Peninsula, the son of Archibald Anderson. He was educated firstly at Inch Clutha school, then later at Otago Boys' High School.

At the age of 20, Anderson leased 2,000 acres from his father to open an antimony mine in the Lammerlaw Range. However, he returned to farming and shepherding in Marlborough, before opening a general store in Bannockburn with James Horn in 1883.

== Political career ==
Anderson contested the Bruce electorate three times.

In the 1885 Bruce by-election he lost to Donald Reid, whom he later stood against (as a Stout-Vogel candidate) successfully in the 1887 election. Following the 1887 election, he represented the Bruce electorate until 1890, when he retired. He later unsuccessfully contested the Bruce electorate in the 1899 election against the incumbent, James Allen.

New Zealand Parliament
Preceded by Donald Reid	Member of Parliament for Bruce; 1887–1890	Succeeded by James William Thomson
