= Donald Reid (politician, born 1850) =

New Zealand solicitor, farmer and local politician

Donald Reid (c. 1850 – 3 September 1922) was a solicitor, farmer and politician who lived in Milton, Otago, New Zealand.

== Otago ==
Donald Reid was born, probably in Dunedin where he was baptised, the eldest son of the 15 children of Scottish parents, Charles Reid (1828–1897), founder of Standard Insurance and his wife Charlotte Thyne Young (1830–1904). Charles was a brother of Donald Reid, founder of the Dunedin stock and station agency Donald Reid & Co.

Educated at Otago Boys' High School he married in 1885 Alicia Charlotte (1862–1933), the eldest daughter of F C Fulton then of Napier formerly of Caversham. She was a cousin of Harry Fulton.

== Politics ==
=== Mayor of Milton ===
New Zealand Parliament
Years	Term	Electorate	Party
1885–1887	9th	Bruce	Independent

Admitted a solicitor in 1873 he went to Milton in 1874 and was elected mayor of Milton the first time in 1879 and returned for a second term at the next election. He served again in 1894, 1895 1896 1897 to 1898 then for a third period from 1906 to 1908. A grand total of 8 terms.

=== Parliament ===
He represented the Bruce electorate from an August 1885 by-election, following the resignation of Robert Gillies, to December 1887 when he was defeated in that election by J C Anderson.

== Decease ==
Donald Reid died at Milton 3 September 1922. He was survived by his widow and three sons: Frank a Dunedin motor vehicle importer and distributor, Donald a Milton farmer and Gordon a Hamilton architect.

New Zealand Parliament
Preceded by Robert Gillies	Member of Parliament for Bruce; 1885–1887	Succeeded by Crawford Anderson
