= John Cargill (politician) =

New Zealand politician

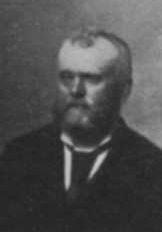
- John Cargill in 1881

Member of the New Zealand Parliament for Dunedin Country
- In office 1 October 1853 – 1858
- Preceded by: first representative
- Succeeded by: John Parkin Taylor

Member of the New Zealand Parliament for Bruce
- In office 7 March 1866 – 1870
- Preceded by: James Macandrew, Arthur John Burns
- Succeeded by: James Clark Brown

Personal details
- Born: 1821 England
- Died: 2 January 1898 (aged 76–77) Okanagan district, British Columbia; Canada
- Relations: Edward Cargill (brother); Johnny Jones (first father-in-law); Isaac Featherston (second father-in-law); John Hyde Harris (in-law)
- Children: nine
- Parent: William Cargill
- Profession: Soldier, runholder, politician

John Cargill (1821 – 2 January 1898) was a New Zealand politician and runholder.

== Early life ==
Cargill was born in 1821; he was the son of William Cargill, one of Otago's most prominent settlers. Edward Cargill was a younger brother. John Cargill served in the Royal Navy, and he served in the West Indies on Ringdove and HMS Seringapatam. He retired from the navy in 1840 and by 1841, he came to Tasmania and then Port Phillip. He visited the Pacific Islands and settled in Ceylon where he had a coffee plantation. He was asked by his father to help with preparations for the Otago emigration scheme and returned to England in 1846. On 24 November 1847, the Cargill family sailed for New Zealand on the ship John Wickliffe, arriving at what is now Port Chalmers, Otago on 23 March 1848.

== New Zealand ==
John Cargill took up a sheep run at the Coast where the Tokomairaro River flows into the Pacific Ocean at Toko Mouth. He then had sheep runs at Mount Stuart, a locality inland from Milton. He later owned the Teviot run with his son-in-law where they had 55,000 merino, and a further run at Gladfield in South Otago.

New Zealand Parliament
Years	Term	Electorate	Party
1853–1855	1st	Dunedin Country	Independent
1855–1858	2nd	Dunedin Country	Independent
1866–1870	4th	Bruce	Independent

He was elected to the 1st New Zealand Parliament as a representative of the Dunedin Country electorate, which covered rural Otago, Southland, and Fiordland. He was re-elected for the 2nd Parliament, serving alongside his father. The house had not been convened in 1857 and Cargill Jr. placed an advertisement in the Otago Witness on 12 September 1857, announcing his intention of handing in his resignation. The resignation became effective when the house next met later in 1858.

He later served in the 4th Parliament, representing the electorate of Bruce (which had been formed out of Dunedin Country), until he resigned in 1870. He was one of five candidates in the 1871 Roslyn by-election and came third. He also participated in Otago Provincial politics.

== British Columbia ==
After running into financial difficulties, Cargill left New Zealand for England in 1884, and went on to British Columbia about three years later. He died in the Okanagan district of British Columbia on 2 January 1898. He is buried in the Armstrong Pioneer Cemetery just north of Vernon, British Columbia, Canada.

== Family ==
Cargill married twice. Firstly in 1849, he married Sarah Charity Jones, the daughter of John Jones. They had four daughters and two sons. One daughter married John Harris, a son of John Hyde Harris. His youngest daughter and his two sons also went to British Columbia. His first wife died on 27 January 1866 at their home in Green Island.

On 1 September 1869, Cargill married Kate Featherston at St. Paul's cathedral in Wellington. She was the third daughter of Isaac Earl Featherston, his fellow member of parliament and Superintendent of Wellington Province. They had three children, of whom two sons survived their childhood.

== Notes ==
New Zealand Parliament
New constituency	Member of Parliament for Dunedin Country; 1853–1858; Served alongside: William Cutten, William Cargill	Succeeded by John Parkin Taylor
Preceded by James Macandrew; Arthur John Burns	Member of Parliament for Bruce; 1866–1870	Succeeded by James Clark Brown
