= 1872 Stafford ministry =

Former government of New Zealand

The third Stafford ministry was the tenth responsible government to be formed in New Zealand, and lasted for a month.

== Background ==
Due largely to the mismanagement of Julius Vogel's Great Public Works policy, which critics suggested had not been thought through in detail and had involved spending which had not been approved by the House, the Fox ministry was ended by a confidence motion proposed by two-time former premier Edward Stafford. The result was 40 votes to 37. The new government's policy was to build railways only with funds approved by the General Assembly, which immediately alienated members who had hoped for new lines though their own electorates. Treasurer Gillies also announced that local roads boards would have their funding from loans cut and that North Island provinces would receive more subsidies than the South due to their higher population of non-taxpaying Maori.

The Stafford ministry had won the votes of two of the Māori members, including Wi Parata, by promising that one minister would be Māori and that confiscated land around Pātea would be returned. However, no such appointment was made (it was even rumoured that Stafford's old political enemy Donald McLean might be appointed Native Minister) and Stafford backed down on land restitution after hearing objections from the current owners. Parata was one of three MHRs who switched to support a no-confidence motion from Julius Vogel barely a month into the ministry's life. Vogel's motion was carried by two votes; Governor Bowen refused Stafford a dissolution and instead appointed George Waterhouse (lately a Minister in Fox's government) as the new premier.

== Ministers ==
The following members served in the Stafford ministry:

| Name | Image | Office | Term |
|---|---|---|---|
| Edward Stafford | | Premier | 10 September 1872 – 11 October 1872 |
| Sir William Fitzherbert | | Secretary for Crown Lands and Immigration | 10 September 1872 – 11 October 1872 |
| Henry Sewell, MLC | | Colonial Secretary | 10 September 1872 – 11 October 1872 |
| Thomas Gillies | | Colonial Treasurer | 10 September 1872 – 11 October 1872 |
| Donald Reid | | Minister for Public Works | 10 September 1872 – 11 October 1872 |
| Oswald Curtis | | Commissioner of Customs | 110 September 1872 – 11 October 1872 |
| Oswald Curtis | | Commissioner of Stamp Duties | 110 September 1872 – 11 October 1872 |
| Oswald Curtis | | Postmaster-General | 110 September 1872 – 11 October 1872 |
| Oswald Curtis | | Telegraph Commissioner | 110 September 1872 – 11 October 1872 |

== See also ==
- New Zealand Government
