= William Butler (New Zealand politician) =

New Zealand politician

New Zealand Parliament
Years	Term	Electorate	Party
1861–1866	3rd	Mongonui	Independent

William Butler (1814 – 4 March 1875) was a 19th-century Member of Parliament in Auckland, New Zealand.

Butler was born in England in 1814 and went to sea at a young age. By age 24, he was commander of a sailing ship that traded with Australia. He traded and was a whaler. He settled in Mangonui (then spelled Mongonui) in Northland, New Zealand and his children were born there from 1841.

He represented the Mongonui electorate from 1861 to 1866, when he retired.

Butler died on 4 March 1875.

New Zealand Parliament
New constituency	Member of Parliament for Mongonui; 1861–1866	Succeeded by Thomas Ball
