= Robert Gillies (New Zealand politician) =

New Zealand politician (1835–1886)

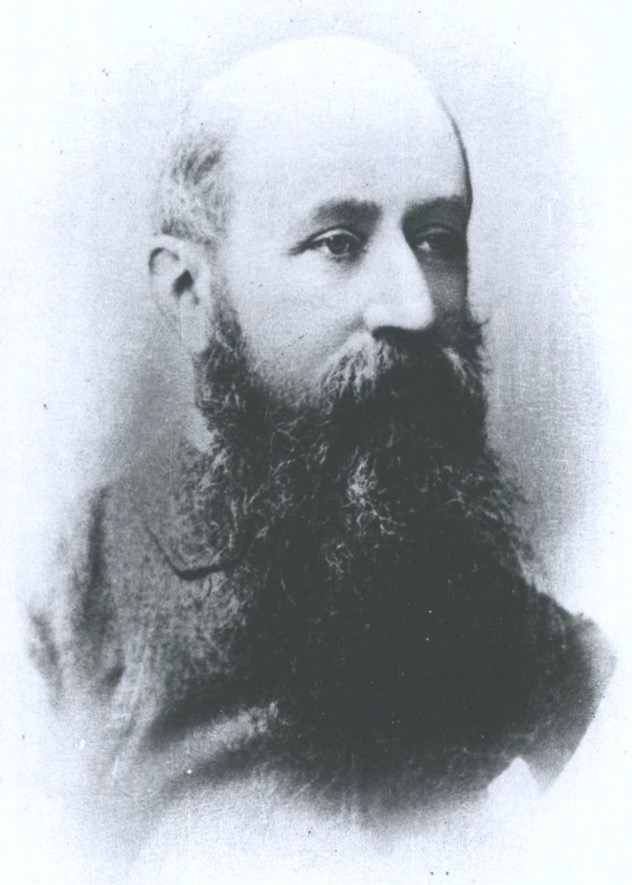
- Robert Gillies in 1876

Member of the New Zealand Parliament for Bruce
- In office 1884–1885
- Majority: 217 (18.38%)

Personal details
- Born: 31 July 1835 Rothesay
- Died: 15 June 1886 (aged 50) Dunedin
- Resting place: Dunedin Northern Cemetery
- Spouse: Emily Street
- Profession: Surveyor

Robert Gillies (31 July 1835 – 15 June 1886) was a 19th-century Member of Parliament in Otago, New Zealand. He was born in Rothesay on the Isle of Bute, Scotland.

He failed to win the Bruce electorate at the 1883 by-election, and won the seat at the general 1884 election by a majority of 217. He resigned in 1885 for failing health, which caused the 1885 Bruce by-election.

He died on 15 June 1886 from an aneurysm of the heart. He was the brother of Thomas Gillies and John Lillie Gillies, and the father of plastic surgeon Harold Gillies. Robert was buried in the Northern Cemetery.

== Family ==
He was one of the eight children (5 sons and 3 daughters) of Isabella (née Lillie) and John Gillies (born Rothesay on 22 April 1802). His father was a lawyer and a member of Otago Provincial Council. Robert spent a year at Glasgow University in 1851, but his father then decided to emigrate. They reached Otago on the barque, Slains Castle, on 6 November 1852 and bought 10 acres (4.0 ha) at Halfway Bush as a family home, and 100 acres (40 ha) at Riversdale, Milton.

In 1866 Robert married Emily Street, the daughter of his business partner. Charles Henry Street (1824–1887 Emily was a niece of Edward Lear, the nonsense writer and landscape painter. Emily, who had moved to Dunedin with her parents and grandparents when aged 5, was a founder of the first kindergarten in Dunedin, and took a keen interest in charitable works. After Robert's death in 1886, Emily moved her family from Dunedin to Auckland.

By 1902, the children had grown up and she bought part of her mother's Birtley estate. In 1905, the wedding of Emily Sophia Gillies (their eldest daughter) and Robert Williams Michell was held at her new Parnell house, Kohanga.

In November 1911, Emily Gillies sold Kohanga, following the death of her mother, Mrs Street, earlier that year. She moved into Birtley, the home she had inherited from her parents, where she remained until her death on 7 September 1913, aged 65.

Emily and Robert had eight children:

- Charles Stuart Gillies helped found the Auckland Golf Club in 1894, was a lawyer and golf champion and died of meningitis
- George John Gillies
- Robert Craig Gillies was a sheep farmer at Hakataramea
- Arthur William Gillies was elected mayor of Hāwera in 1912, started the development of Kawaha Point at Rotorua and became a stockbroker in Auckland
- Harry Thomas Gillies was Crown Prosecutor at Hamilton for 36 years from 1910
- Emily Sophia Michell was at Cambridge and a golf champion, who died in France
- Eleanor Lillie Bowen was at Parnell, a golf champion and worked with charities for the blind in Cape Town
- Dr Harold Gillies was an otolaryngologist and surgeon now considered to be the father of plastic surgery

== Business ==
Robert worked on the family's Milton farm and helped form the Bruce Agricultural Society. Later he farmed at Awamoko, near Duntroon, where he bred Leicester sheep. From 1857 to 1860 he worked for Otago Provincial Surveying Department, being one of the first to discover gold on the banks of several streams. In 1861 he joined Charles Henry Street (1824-1887) as an estate agent. Walter Hislop replaced Charles Street in the partnership, the firm becoming 'Gillies, Street & Hislop'. In 1884 they amalgamated with Connell & Moodie, to form the Perpetual Trustees and Agency Company, which Robert chaired. The Perpetual Trustees Estate and Agency Co Ltd continues, after further mergers, as Perpetual Guardian. Robert was a director of Dunedin Waterworks Company and chairman of Westport Coal Company. He was a founder of the Presbyterian Knox Church, president of its Young Men's Association, started its library, local Treasurer of the London Missionary Society and a founder of the Otago Institute. Robert took part in observations of the Transit of Venus, naming his house Transit House.

New Zealand Parliament
Years	Term	Electorate	Party
1884–1885	9th	Bruce	Independent

New Zealand Parliament
Preceded by James McDonald	Member of Parliament for Bruce; 1884–1885	Succeeded by Donald Reid
