= Henry Coote =

New Zealand politician (1819–1867)

Henry Joseph Coote (9 January 1819 – 25 March 1867), known as Major Coote, (Note: Army ranks of Captain and above are retained in retirement) was a British army officer who served in India, Corfu and New Zealand and returned to breed sheep in New Zealand on his retirement from the army. He was a member of the New Zealand Legislative Council from 8 July 1865 until his death in his 49th year on 25 March 1867.

Born in London in 1819, third son of barrister of the court of chancery Richard Holmes Coote and his wife Elizabeth née Callander he was a younger brother of surgeon Holmes Coote 1817–1872. A professional soldier Henry Joseph Coote had been educated at the Royal Military College, Sandhurst. Commissioned Lieutenant in 1839 and Captain in 1844 Coote was appointed Major in 1857 when attached to the new arrivals in New Zealand, the 18th Regiment of Foot.

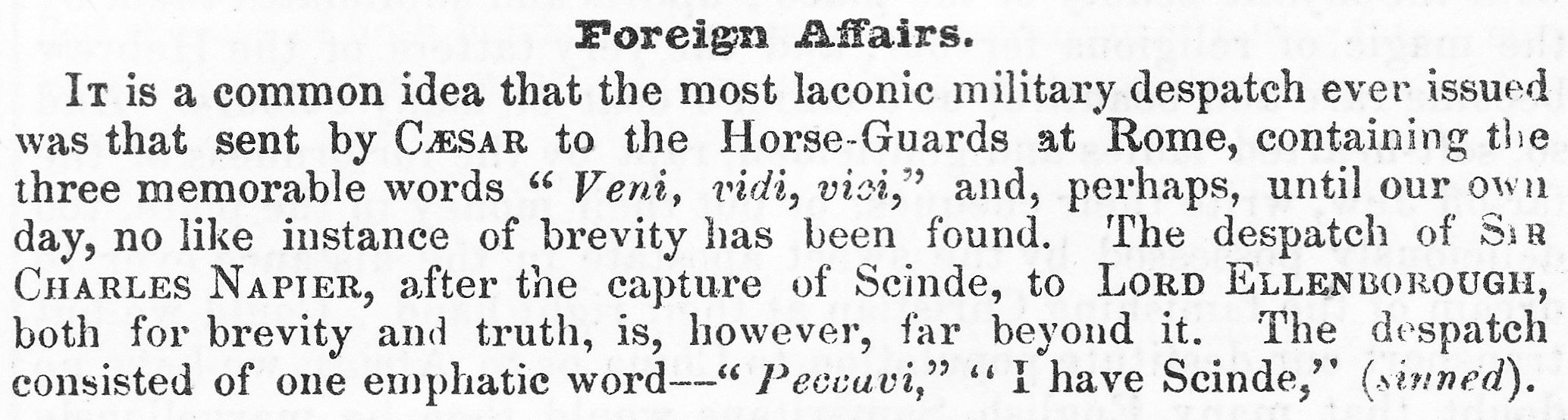
Punch Magazine – 18 May 1844

He was aide-de-camp to General Sir Charles James Napier in the 1843 conquest of Scinde and after he was the first man to enter the enemy position at Hyderabad (peccavi) described by the General as "the intrepid Coote". Wounded he returned to England, marrying in 1844. He later joined the 36th (Herefordshire) Regiment of Foot and served in the Ionian Islands, where he distinguished himself in Cephalonia during the time that Henry George Ward was Lord High Commissioner.

Coote was appointed Brigade-Major to the 65th Regiment of Foot in Wellington New Zealand in 1852. On half pay from 1 July 1853 he returned to England in 1858 soon after his promotion to Major. There he lobbied the War Office to put a force together under his command to fight in the New Zealand Wars but was unsuccessful.

He retired from the army and returned to New Zealand arriving in December 1861. He took up the Carleton run near Oxford, Canterbury and won prizes for his merinos. He left Canterbury and settled in 1864 first at Opaki north of Masterton then as he had originally intended about four miles west of Masterton on Matahiwi Station which he had purchased in 1861. It was later described in an (unsuccessful) 1896 petition for compulsory purchase under Seddon's Lands for Settlement Act as six or seven thousand acres of good land, some first-class some second.

An accomplished artist in watercolours he was a regular exhibitor. His portraits of Te Rauparaha and Te Rangihaeata were engraved and published in Sydney.

Major Coote married Rhoda Carleton Holmes, daughter of William Holmes of Worthing, Sussex at Lyminster on 22 October 1844. There were no surviving children of the marriage. He died after a long illness aged 48 on 25 March 1867 and she died in England in December 1898. Their property went to his wife's family. The main homestead is now the site of a residence of Sir Peter Jackson.
