= Mongonui (electorate) =

Mongonui was a parliamentary electorate in the Far North of New Zealand from 1861 to 1870. It was a single-member electorate, and was represented by three successive members of Parliament during its existence.

== Population centres ==
In the 1860 electoral redistribution, the House of Representatives increased the number of representatives by 12, reflecting the immense population growth since the original electorates were established in 1853. The redistribution created 15 additional electorates with between one and three members, and Mongonui was one of the single-member electorates. The electorates were distributed to provinces so that every province had at least two members. Within each province, the number of registered electors by electorate varied greatly.

The electorate was formed through the Representation Act 1860, which describes its area as follows:

This electoral district comprises so much of the North Island as lies to the north of a line from the head of False Hokianga Harbour to the summit of Maungataniwha Mountain, and thence to the mouth of the Pupuke River, at the head of Wangaroa Harbour, including the adjacent islands.

Population centres that thus fell within the electorate included Kaitaia and Mangōnui (which was spelled Mongonui before the 1880s).

The next electoral redistribution in 1865 affected South Island electorates only. The subsequent 1870 electoral redistribution abolished the Mongonui electorate. The Mongonui electorate went to the new Mongonui and Bay of Islands electorate in its entirety, and the northern part of the Bay of Islands electorate formed the balance.

== History ==
The first representative was William Butler, who won the 1861 election. Butler retired at the end of the parliamentary term in 1866. He was succeeded by Thomas Ball, who was elected unopposed on 21 March 1866, but resigned in 1870. Thomas Gillies, who had previously held two Otago electorates, won the resulting 1870 by-election.

== Members of Parliament ==
The Mongonui electorate was represented by three successive Members of Parliament.

Key

Independent

Election	Winner
1861 election	William Butler
1866 election	Thomas Ball
1870 by-election	Thomas Gillies
(Electorate abolished; see Mongonui and Bay of Islands)
