= 1883 Bruce by-election =

New Zealand by-election

The 1883 Bruce by-election was a by-election held on 29 June in the Bruce electorate during the 8th New Zealand Parliament.

The by-election was caused by the death on 16 May of the incumbent MP James Rutherford.

On a show of hands Mr Gillies won, but the third candidate William A. Mosley demanded a poll.

The by-election was won by James McDonald.

However, in the 1884 election Gillies won the seat and McDonald came third.

== Results ==
The following table gives the election result:

1883 Bruce by-election
Party	Candidate	Votes	%	±%
Independent	James McDonald	472	46.64	
Independent	Robert Gillies	451	44.57	
Independent	William A. Mosley	89	8.79	
Majority		21	2.08	
Turnout		1136		
