= Charles Kettle (cricketer) =

New Zealand cricketer, lawyer and judge (1850–1918)

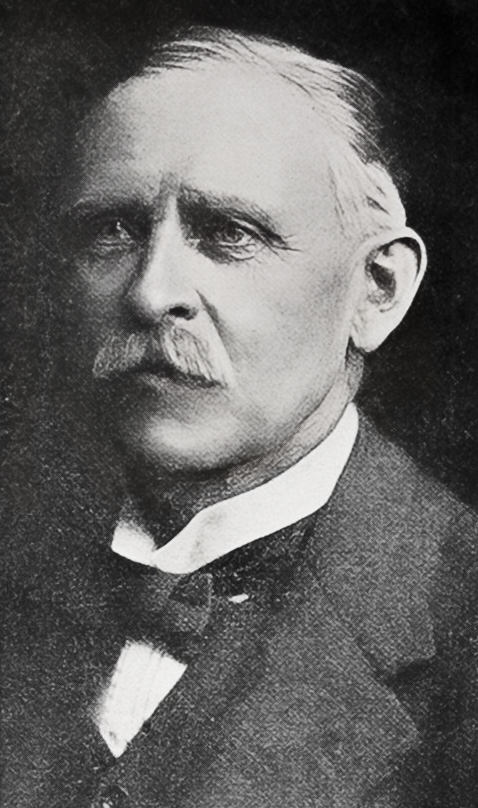
- Kettle in later life

Personal information
- Full name: Charles Cargill Kettle
- Born: 4 June 1850; Dunedin, Otago, New Zealand
- Died: 17 December 1918 (aged 68); Auckland, New Zealand
- Relatives: Charles Kettle (father)

Domestic team information
- Years: Team
- 1868/69–1871/72: Otago
- FC debut: 8 February 1869 Otago v Canterbury
- Last FC: 28 December 1871 Otago v Canterbury

Career statistics
Competition	First-class
Matches	4
Runs scored	67
Batting average	9.57
100s/50s	0/0
Top score	28*
Balls bowled	12
Wickets	0
Bowling average	–
5 wickets in innings	–
10 wickets in match	–
Best bowling	–
Catches/stumpings	1/–
- Source: ESPNcricinfo, 15 May 2016

Charles Cargill Kettle (4 June 1850 – 17 December 1918) was a New Zealand cricketer, lawyer and judge. He played four first-class matches for Otago between 1868–69 and 1871–72. He was the first person born in New Zealand to be appointed a judge.

Kettle was born in Dunedin on 4 June 1850, the son of Charles Henry Kettle. He was educated at Nelson College from 1862 to 1863 and then at Otago Boys' High School. After leaving school, he was articled to Dunedin lawyer James Macassey in 1868, and admitted as a barrister and solicitor in 1873. He practised law in Dunedin until being appointed district judge for Wanganui and Taranaki, and resident magistrate for New Plymouth in 1890, becoming the first New Zealand-born judge. He transferred to Auckland in about 1901, and became stipendiary magistrate there when the district courts were abolished. He died in Auckland on 17 December 1918 at the age of 68, having retired from the bench a few months earlier.

Kettle played first-class cricket four times for Otago against Canterbury, once in each of the representative matches played in the years between 1868–69 and 1871–72. At the time these were the only first-class matches played in New Zealand. He scored a total of 67 runs, with a highest score of 28 not out made on his debut.
