= Charles Kettle =

New Zealand politician

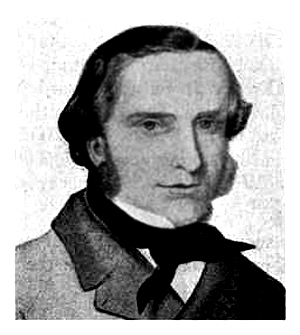
Charles Kettle.

Charles Henry Kettle (6 April 1821 – 3 June 1863) surveyed the city of Dunedin in New Zealand, imposing a bold design on a challenging landscape. He was aiming to create a Romantic effect and incidentally produced the world's steepest street, Baldwin Street.

== Early life ==
Born in Kent in England, Charles Henry Kettle was the son of Nathaniel Kettle. The family were poor and Charles worked as a teaching assistant at Queens Grammar School in Faversham in Kent before sailing for New Zealand on the Oriental in 1839.

== First New Zealand period ==
Kettle arrived at Port Nicholson, Wellington in 1840. He was a cadet in William Mein Smith's survey corps, and was soon promoted on the strength of his abilities. In 1842, he led an exploration party up the Manawatu River penetrating to the Wairarapa district, helping to stimulate its pastoral development. In 1843, he returned to Britain and became a publicist for the projected New Edinburgh settlement in Otago in New Zealand's South Island. He travelled widely for this purpose for two years and appeared before a House of Commons Select Committee on New Zealand in June 1844 as an expert on the country. In September 1845, he was appointed to head the survey of the new Scottish settlement. He married Amelia Omer at St Peter's Sandwich, Kent, 10 September 1845.

== Final emigration to New Zealand ==
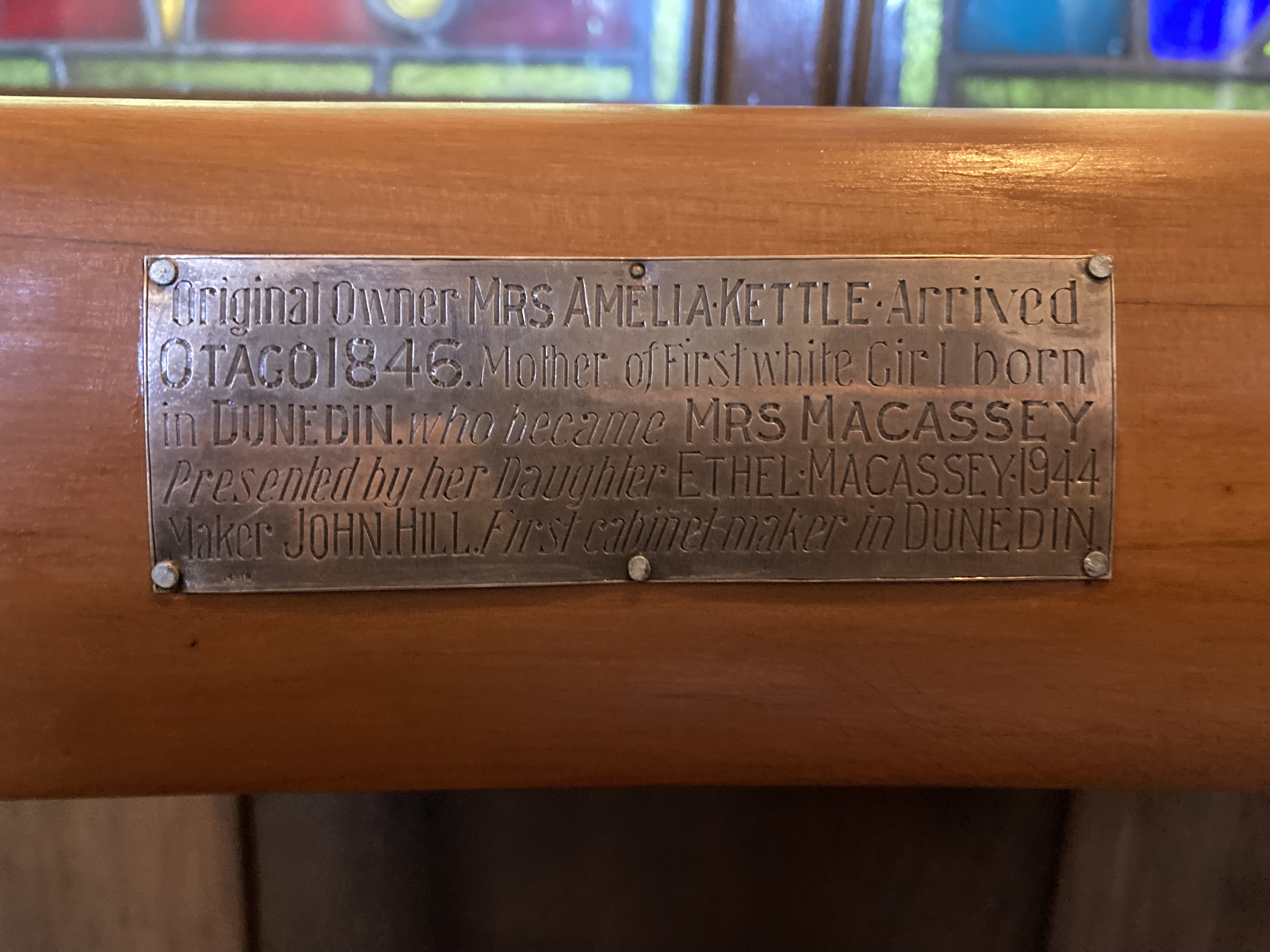
A plaque on a chair at Otago Pioneer Women's Memorial Hall records that it belonged to Amelia Kettle, "mother of first white girl born in Dunedin", and was made by John Hill, the first cabinet maker in Dunedin.

Kettle and his wife reached Otago Harbour in February 1846.

=== Dunedin surveys ===
In his Otago surveys, Kettle made the first extensive use in New Zealand of trigonometrical methods and his urban and rural surveys have been described as 'painstaking'. He travelled extensively over the rugged Otago Block, whose daunting contours scarcely warrant a mention in his correspondence. He climbed Mount Maungatua on the Taieri Plain in 1847 and from there saw the interior of Central Otago. He identified the land as suited for pastoralism and correctly saw that as the colony's future economic mainstay. By March 1848, when the first immigrant ships arrived, the surveys' outlines were virtually complete.

Kettle continued working on the project for the next two years but after the demise of the New Zealand Company in 1850, his relations with William Cargill, leader of the Otago settlement, deteriorated, partly because Kettle was English while Cargill was narrowly Scottish. By 1852, Kettle had been made the colonial government's surveyor at Otago, thus resolving some of the tensions. In 1854 he resigned.

He had already made tours of the pastoral districts and had himself taken up some land for sheep runs. By 1860, he was able to sell his pastoral licences and retire to Dunedin. In 1861, he became a member of the New Zealand House of Representatives, the colonial parliament, the same year that saw the first gold rushes to the Otago hinterland. This greatly swelled the population of Dunedin. Many were camped in a place unprepared for such an influx. Sanitation broke down and Kettle died of typhoid fever on 5 June 1862, contracted, it is said, from a too-close examination of Dunedin's drains. His principal monument is the city that he surveyed and that many others built.

Kettle's instructions had been to reproduce, so far as possible, the characteristics of Edinburgh in Scotland. (Hocken, 1898, p. 82.) He did not, as it is popularly supposed, simply impose that city's plan on Dunedin's site. He did not take Edinburgh's Old Town as his model, but the New Town, by that time perhaps the most widely admired urban development in Europe. Kettle set out to juxtapose formality, regularity, symmetry and proportion – relieved from monotony by some designed-in features – with a bold and rugged nature to make the design Romantic in the manner of Edinburgh and the fashion of the day. While Edinburgh's New Town is a modern agora on a ridge, Dunedin's central city is a low-lying harbourside parade, set among bold hills, with distant views of harbour steeps and bush-clad ridges, a Claudian seaport, a park of orderly temples lapped by water, in a rugged terrain.

Kettle achieved this with a central grid oriented roughly north and south beside the harbour with designed-in features, such as The Octagon, circled on the landward side by a reserved Town Belt to separate the city from its suburbs, the waters of the harbour forming its other margin. The modern central city is a Temple Plain. The carriageways descending the landward escarpment, such as High Street and Stuart Street, extraordinarily steep for the horse-drawn age, afford dramatic views of the town in its setting, as its author intended.

Kettle's town plan was the only nineteenth century one in New Zealand formed from a specific aesthetic instruction. While others such as those at Wellington and Auckland combined similar elements of symmetry and regularity in a dramatic setting, Mein Smith's design for Wellington is considered dull and while Felton Matthew's for Auckland is much better on paper, neither was more than partly realised.

In Dunedin, Presbyterian fortitude or perhaps the wealth suddenly afforded by the gold rushes resulted in Kettle's highly ambitious plan being mostly realised and extrapolated. There were (and still are) streets that tail off into flights of steps, and others, like Baldwin Street, that challenge the pedestrian. But by and large the vision was realised. The artist George O'Brien has left a vivid record of the process and the result. Many of those works are in the Otago Settlers Museum, Dunedin. His papers are in the Hocken Collections, Dunedin.

== Member of Parliament ==
New Zealand Parliament
Years	Term	Electorate	Party
1861–1862	3rd	Bruce	Independent

Kettle retired from surveying to Dunedin. He stood for election to the Provincial Council, but was unsuccessful. Kettle and Thomas Gillies were the only two candidates for the newly constituted two-member electorate of Bruce in the 1861 general election. They were thus declared elected unopposed on 11 February 1861. After having attended only one session of the 3rd New Zealand Parliament, he died of typhoid fever on 5 June 1862, and was buried in Dunedin Southern Cemetery.

== Legacy and tributes ==
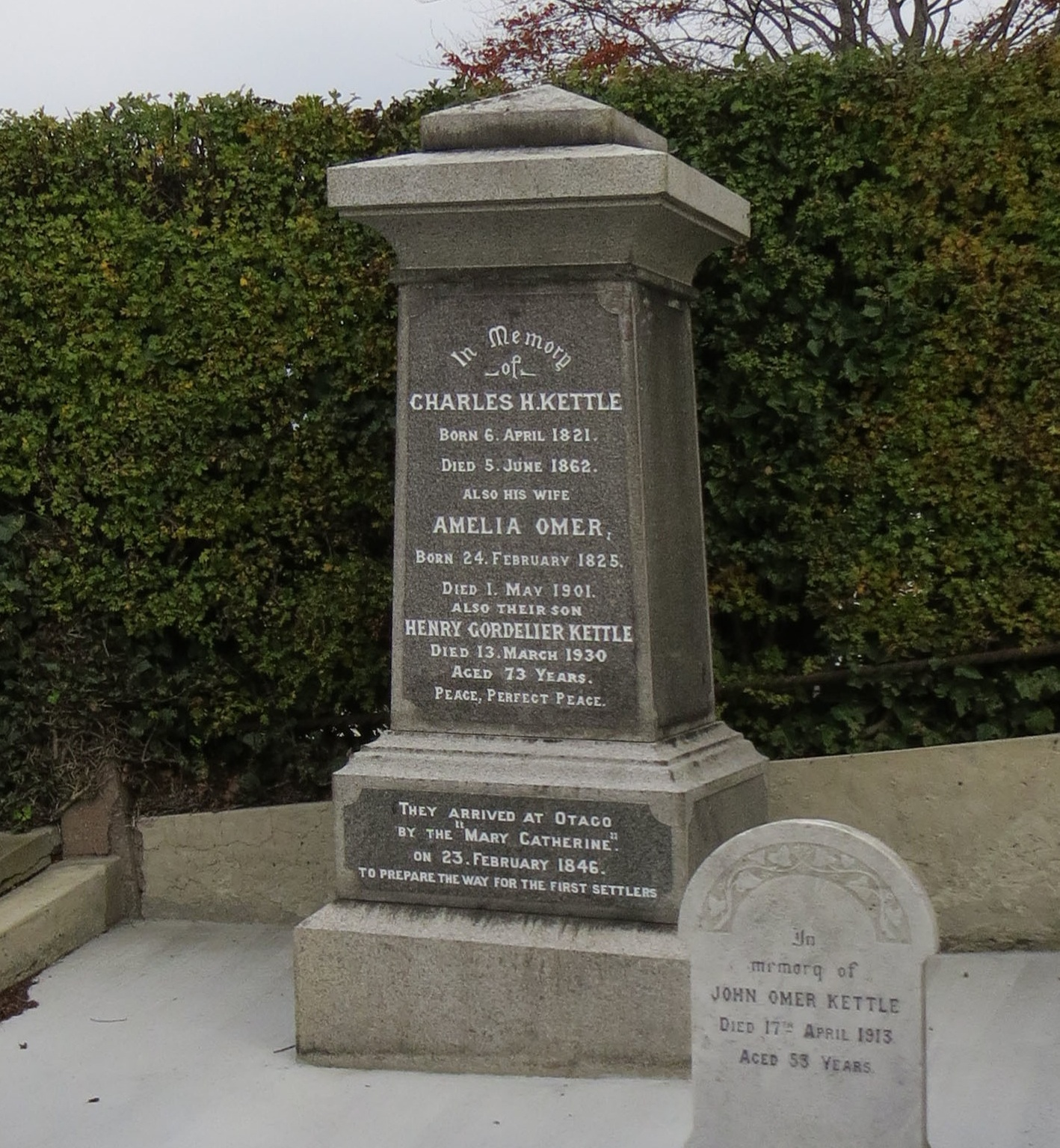
Tomb of Charles Kettle in Dunedin Southern Cemetery

Kettle Park, in the Dunedin suburb of St. Kilda, is named in honour of Charles Kettle.

== Family ==
Kettle's sone, Charles Cargill Kettle, was the first person born in New Zealand to become a judge. He also played first-class cricket for the Otago cricket team. Kettle's daughter Louisa married Sir John Roberts of Murray Roberts & Co and her brother, Nathaniel Kettle, founded stock and station agency Williams & Kettle.

New Zealand Parliament
New constituency	Member of Parliament for Bruce; 1861–1862; Served alongside: Thomas Gillies	Succeeded by Edward Cargill
