= William Murray (New Zealand politician) =

New Zealand politician (1832–1900)

William Archibald Murray (1832 – 26 June 1900) was a 19th-century Member of Parliament in Otago, New Zealand. During his time in parliament, he moved to the Waikato.

== Biography ==
Brothers William, John (died 1896), and James Murray (died 1899) arrived in Dunedin, New Zealand from Scotland aboard the Nourmahal on 16 April 1858. Their parents John and Jane, two more brothers, Thomas and George, and George's wife and three children, arrived in Dunedin aboard the Agra in October later that year. The family had, for several generations, farmed 880acres at Marygold in Bunkle and Preston, Berwickshire, Scotland, but came to New Zealand presumably for the opportunity it then provided to acquire and develop land. Initially, William bought 3,000 acres of land in the Waitahuna districts in Otago in partnership with his brother James while his brother Thomas acquired 8,000acres at Mount Stuart just to the South. George bought land in East Taieri and greatly expanded the family Boarder Leicester sheep stud.

New Zealand Parliament
Years	Term	Electorate	Party
1871–1875	5th	Bruce	Independent
1875–1879	6th	Bruce	Independent
1879–1881	7th	Bruce	Independent

In 1869, William stood in the Taieri by-election and of six candidates, he came third. Then, in January 1871, he was elected to the Bruce electorate and in the 1875 election, he was returned unopposed. The Otago Daily Times described him as follows:

William Archibald Murray, the member for Bruce, is a tall, active, restless man, with an original, daring mind, that in the days of the Caesars or Stuarts would have certainly brought him to the gallows. He has no reverence for existing institutions, no veneration for the powers that be, no fear of the most daring novelties, and no want of confidence in himself.

In the 1881 election, he was defeated by James Rutherford. When Robert Gillies resigned from the Bruce electorate in 1885 over failing health, Murray was asked to offer himself for re-election but he declined.

Shortly after the 1875 election he moved to the Piako district in the Waikato where he initially purchased 1,200 acres of land near what was to become Morrinsville. Much of this was at the time, undeveloped wetland. He eventually expanded his land holding to a reputed 12,000 acres in both freehold and Maori leasehold land. This he named the Annandale Estate after one of his 17th century ancestors, John Murray, the 1st Earl of Annandale. Over the next ten years, with the help of his brothers John and Thomas, he set about draining the wetland areas and establishing pasture. A correspondent reporting on swamp reclamation in October 1882 wrote that he had;

"...a large extent of swamp, and is reclaiming it slowly, but surely, and to see his paddocks from the road as you ride along shows how excellent the land is. They look splendid, and he has had wonderfully good crops off them of oats, turnips, &c. That time is one of the great essentials to swamp draining has been proved by this gentleman, who tried to grow crops on the swamp immediately on its coming in, but in some instances did not get anything worth harvesting, Now the same land is A1".

In circa 1890, he moved to Glen Murray near Raglan in the Franklin district. Murray contested the 1891 Waikato by-election, but was beaten by Edward Lake. In 1868, William Murray had a fence wire straining mechanism patented under his name. He applied for a further wire straining patent in 1877. In 1885, he applied for a patent for a vehicle engine that ran on compressed gas.

At the age of 68, Murray died on 26 June 1900 at Newmarket in Auckland. He had never married.

New Zealand Parliament
Preceded by James Clark Brown	Member of Parliament for Bruce; 1871–1881	Succeeded by James Rutherford
