= Babington's tea room =

English tea shop in Rome

Babington's Tea Room
- Interactive map of Babington's Tea Room

Restaurant information
- Established: 1893
- Food type: Traditional English Tea, pastries
- Dress code: Casual elegant (Staff in Victorian uniform)
- Location: Piazza di Spagna 23, Rome, Italy
- Coordinates: 41°54′22″N 12°28′57″E
- Website: www.babingtons.com

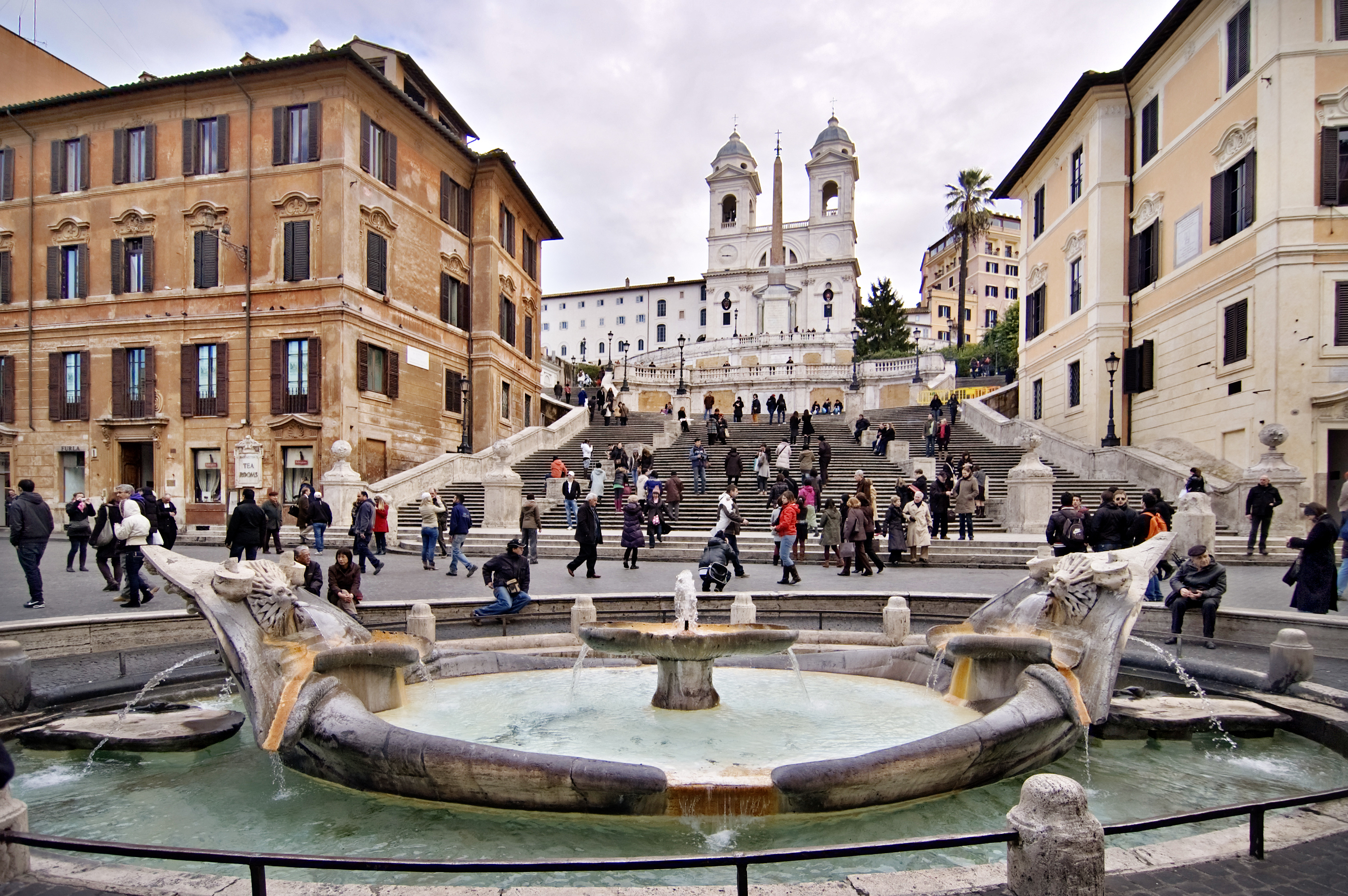
Babington's tea room, on the left of the Spanish Steps

Babington's tea room, established in 1893, is a traditional English tea shop at the foot of the Spanish Steps in the Piazza di Spagna in Rome, Italy.

== History ==
The tea room was founded by two young women, one from New Zealand and one from England, who arrived in Rome in 1893. They were Isabel Cargill, granddaughter of William Cargill, founder of the city of Dunedin in New Zealand and Anna Maria Babington, descendant of Anthony Babington who was hanged in 1586 for conspiring against Elizabeth I. The women decided to invest their savings (100 pounds) by opening a tea and reading room in the capital for the Anglo-Saxon community. The venture at the time involved considerable risks, above all because in Italy it was not common to drink tea, which was sold only in pharmacies.

Babington's tea room was an immediate success, both because Italy was the destination of the Grand Tour for the English and because it was part of a Rome that celebrated the Jubilee and the silver wedding of the royals Umberto and Margherita.

Originally the tea room was on Via dei Due Macelli, a sideroad of the Piazza di Spagna, but the establishment's success encouraged the owners to relocate to the Piazza di Spagna 23. It is located on the ground floor of an 18th-century building from which one can see the Spanish Steps, the staircase of the Trinità dei Monti church.

These buildings are the original stables of the 18th century palazzo designed by Francesco De Sanctis, architect of the Spanish Steps.

The new tea room on the Piazza di Spagna was furnished elegantly and became, according to the English language Roman Herald, a favoured meeting place "where ladies or gentlemen, hard at work sightseeing could go to refresh themselves with a comforting cup of tea."

During the First World War, Rome society plunged into depression but the tea room survived. Cargill's sister Annie invested her life's savings to give the premises a complete renovation. Anna Maria Babington moved to Switzerland because of her failing health, and died of a heart attack in 1929.

Despite the anti-English policy of Mussolini, throughout the fascist period and even during the Second World War, Babington's remained open, with its very clear sign in English and solid bronze characters on a Roman travertine plaque.

During the 1950s and 1960s, with the success of Cinecittà, film stars and other celebrities frequented the tea room, some even as regulars, including Richard Burton and Liz Taylor, Charlton Heston, Robert Taylor, Peter Ustinov, Audrey Hepburn and filmmaker Federico Fellini.

The Babington's staff had a regular cat guest, Mascherino, who was a stray Roman cat adopted in the late 1950s and became the tearoom's mascot.

Babington's staff still serve Victoria Afternoon Tea in uniform. One of the tea blenders is Melania Francis Lopez, who created the Royal Wedding blend.

Babington's survived two World Wars, the advent of fast food and various economic crises, to become a Roman institution and tourist attraction. The tea room is run by the fourth generation descendant of Isabel Cargill.
