= Holmes Coote =

English surgeon

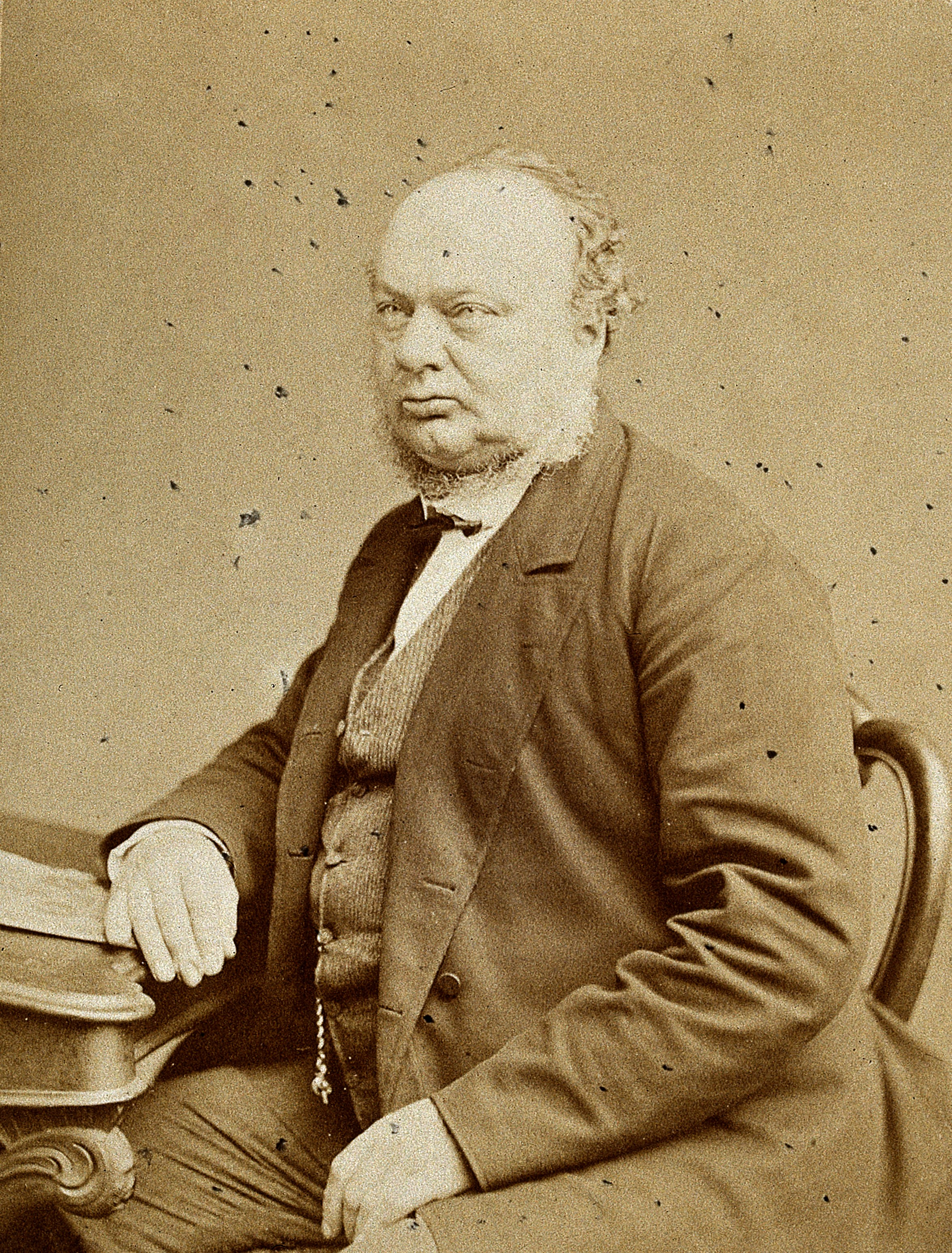
- 1868
- Born: 10 November 1817
- Died: December 1872 (aged 55)
- Occupation: Surgeon

Holmes Coote (10 November 1817 – December 1872) was an English surgeon.

== Biography ==
Coote was born on 10 November 1817, and was second son of Richard Holmes Coote, a conveyancer. He was educated at Westminster School, and at the age of sixteen was made apprentice to Sir William Lawrence, one of the surgeons to St. Bartholomew's Hospital. In 1845 he obtained a prize at the College of Surgeons for an essay ‘On the Anatomy of the Fibres of the Human Brain, illustrated by the Anatomy of the same parts in the Lower Vertebrata.’ His first book was published in 1849, ‘The Homologies of the Human Skeleton,’ and is an explanation of the relation of the several bones of the human skeleton to the parts of the archetype skeleton of Richard Owen. It is a mere piece of book-work. He was elected demonstrator of anatomy in the St. Bartholomew's Medical School, and continued to teach in the dissecting-room till elected assistant surgeon in 1854. Shortly after he received leave from the governors of the hospital to be absent as civil surgeon in charge of the wounded from the Crimean war at Smyrna. After his return he published ‘A Report on some of the more important Points in the Treatment of Syphilis,’ 1857, and in 1863 he was elected surgeon to the hospital. Besides some shorter writings, Coote published in the ‘St. Bartholomew's Hospital Reports’ three papers on diseases of the joints (vols. i. and ii.), one on the treatment of wounds (vol. vi.), on rickets (vol. v.), on operations for stone (vol. iv.), and one on a case of aneurysm. In 1867 he published a volume ‘On Joint Diseases.’ He wrote easily, but without much collected observation, thought, or research, and it is only as evidence of the practice of his period that his works deserve consultation. He was a tall man of burly frame, of kindly disposition and convivial tastes. He married twice, but was never in easy circumstances, nor attained much practice. While still in the prime of life he looked older than his years, and was attacked by general paralysis with delusions of boundless wealth, and died in December 1872.
