= James Rutherford (New Zealand politician) =

New Zealand politician

New Zealand Parliament
| Years | Term | Electorate | Party |
|---|---|---|---|
| 1881–1883 | 8th | Bruce | Independent |

James Rutherford (1825 – 16 May 1883) was a 19th-century Member of Parliament in Otago, New Zealand.

He represented the Bruce electorate from 1881 to 1883, when he died.

New Zealand Parliament
| Preceded by William Murray | Member of Parliament for Bruce; 1881–1883 | Succeeded by James McDonald |
