= Southland Province =

Coordinates: 46°24′47″S 168°20′51″E

- Provinces of New Zealand
- Southland Province within New Zealand
- Country: New Zealand
- Island: South Island
- Established: 1861
- Abolished: 1870
- Seat: Invercargill

The Southland Province was a province of New Zealand from March 1861, when it split from Otago Province, until 1870, when it rejoined Otago.

== History ==
Following the passage of the New Zealand Constitution Act 1852 by the British Parliament, New Zealand was divided into six new provinces in 1853, the southern part of the South Island was part of the Otago Province. Settlers in Murihiku, the southernmost part of the South Island purchased from Māori in 1853 by Walter Mantell, petitioned the government for separation from Otago. Petitioning started in 1857. The central government's General Assembly passed the New Provinces Act in 1858, and the Province of Southland was proclaimed in 1861. It was named Southland despite the wishes of many settlers and Māori, who preferred Murihiku.

The province started to accumulate debt, whereas Otago prospered due to the Otago gold rush. By the late 1860s, most settlers wanted to become part of the Otago Province again, and this was achieved in 1870.

== Area ==
The province was much smaller than the present-day Southland region. The area was bounded by the Mataura River (east), the Waiau River (west), and a line from Eyre Peak to Lake Manapouri (north). Stewart Island was purchased by the Crown in 1863 and added to the area. The capital and largest settlement of Southland Province was Invercargill.

== Railways ==
The Southland Province began a number of railway projects. The branch line to Bluff (which was known as Campbelltown until 1917) opened on 5 February 1867. It was built to international standard gauge of 1,435 mm (4 feet 8.5 inches), wider than the national gauge of 1,067 mm (3 feet 6 inches) gauge. When the central government passed legislation setting a single standard for track gauges, the line was converted to the new gauge in a single day, 18 December 1875. The railway later became part of the New Zealand Railways Department.

== Anniversary Day ==
Founded: 1 April 1861

New Zealand law provides an anniversary day for each province.

== Superintendents ==
The Southland Province had three Superintendents:

No.	from	to	Superintendent
1	3 August 1861	Nov 1864	James Alexander Robertson Menzies
2	13 March 1865	Nov 1869	John Parkin Taylor
3	10 November 1869	Sep 1870	William Wood

== Legislation ==
- 1861 Breaks away from Otago Province
- 1870 Reunited with Otago
