= James McDonald (New Zealand politician) =

New Zealand politician

New Zealand Parliament
Years	Term	Electorate	Party
1883–1884	8th	Bruce	Independent

James McDonald (1837 – 12 March 1900) was a 19th-century Member of Parliament in Otago, New Zealand.

He represented the Bruce electorate from 1883 to 1884, when he was defeated by Robert Gillies.

New Zealand Parliament
Preceded by James Rutherford	Member of Parliament for Bruce; 1883–1884	Succeeded by Robert Gillies
