= Thomas Gillies =

New Zealand politician (1828–1889)

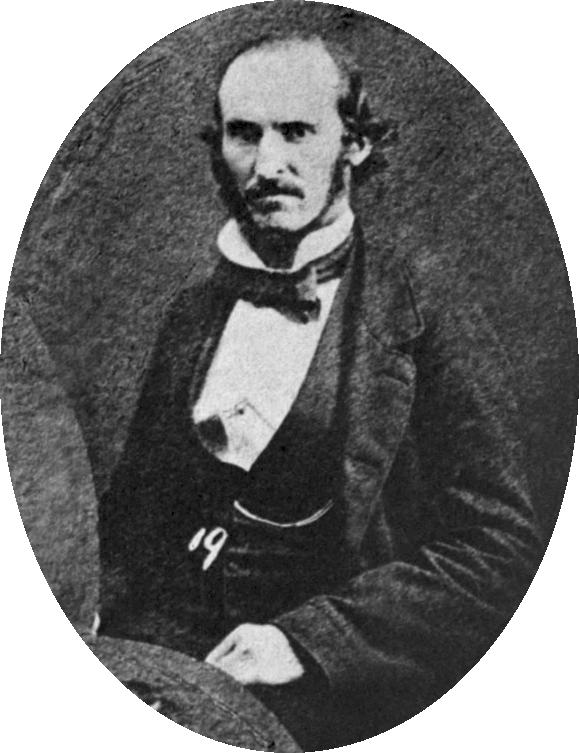

4th Attorney-General of New Zealand
- In office 6 August 1862 – 23 August 1862
- Prime Minister: Alfred Domett
- Preceded by: Henry Sewell
- Succeeded by: Henry Sewell

4th Postmaster-General
- In office 30 October 1863 – 24 November 1864
- Prime Minister: Frederick Whitaker
- Preceded by: Crosbie Ward
- Succeeded by: John Richardson

7th Superintendent of Auckland Province
- In office 2 December 1869 – November 1873
- Preceded by: John Williamson
- Succeeded by: John Williamson

Personal details
- Born: Thomas Bannatyne Gillies; 17 January 1828 Rothesay, Isle of Bute, Scotland
- Died: 26 July 1889 (aged 61) Rocklands, Gillies Ave, Epsom, Auckland
- Resting place: St Andrew's Cemetery, Epsom
- Occupation: Lawyer, politician

Thomas Bannatyne Gillies (17 January 1828 – 26 July 1889) was a 19th-century New Zealand lawyer, judge and politician.

== Early life ==
He was born at Rothesay on the Isle of Bute, Scotland, on 17 January 1828. He was the eldest of nine children of John Gillies, local lawyer and town clerk, and his wife, Isabella Lillie, daughter of a Glasgow businessman and granddaughter of a Huguenot refugee. Determined to train as a mechanical engineer, he was forced by his father to study law and trained in his father's practice for four years. He then went to Manchester, where he worked for Robert Barbour and Sons, with his next brother John taking his place in his father's firm. The two brothers intended to join the California Gold Rush but their father did not allow them to do so, and John emigrated to Australia instead in about 1850. John Gillies senior was so committed with various duties that his health suffered and after long discussions, it was agreed to emigrate to Otago, New Zealand.

On 1 June 1852, Thomas Gillies married Catherine Douglas at Newcastle upon Tyne. The whole family, including their brother Robert Gillies, left for New Zealand on 24 July on the Slains Castle. They were soon joined in Otago by John Gillies Jr., who came over from Australia.

== Career ==
=== Professional ===
Gillies joined the practise of his father John Gillies and John Hyde Harris in July 1857. In the 1860s, he ran a law practice in Dunedin with William Richmond, a fellow (ex) MP.

=== Political ===
New Zealand Parliament
Years	Term	Electorate	Party
1860	2nd	Dunedin Country	Independent
1861–1865	3rd	Bruce	Independent
1870	4th	Mongonui	Independent
1871–1875	5th	Auckland West	Independent

He was the Member of Parliament for Dunedin Country from 1860 (after a by-election), then Bruce 1861 to 1865; two electorates in the South Island. While he had been a cabinet minister in the Domett Ministry (August 1862) and then the Whitaker–Fox Ministry (October 1863 – November 1864), he was a strong separationist, but did not get majority support in the ministries or from parliament as a whole, and he resigned his parliamentary seat in early 1865 as he could not achieve separation of the South Island. He first talked about having resigned in public on 6 January 1865 but the resignation did not take effect until 3 March of that year.

Gillies then represented Mongonui 1870 (elected 30 March 1870; Parliament dissolved 30 December 1870) then Auckland West 1871 to 1875 (resigned); two electorates in the North Island.

He was the seventh Superintendent of Auckland Province from 1869 to 1873.

He was a cabinet minister, and held the positions of Attorney-General (August 1862) in the Domett Ministry, Postmaster-General and Secretary for Crown Lands (1863–1864) in the Whitaker–Fox Ministry, and Colonial Treasurer (1872) in the third Stafford Ministry.

=== Science ===
Gillies and Frederick Wollaston Hutton initiated the public meeting of 6 November 1867, to establish the Auckland Philosophical Society, soon renamed Auckland Institute, following a conversation they'd had about the General Assembly's efforts in forming the New Zealand Institute. When Gillies had visited Wellington, James Hector, manager of the institute, had suggested the appropriateness of establishing branches throughout New Zealand, especially in Auckland. In consequence, the newly formed Auckland Institute was incorporated with the New Zealand Institute on 10 June 1868. Gillies served as president of the Auckland Institute in 1869, with the transfer of Auckland Museum to the Auckland Institute in October 1869, as well as in 1873 and 1876. He also contributed papers on scientific matters to the Auckland Institute and New Zealand Institute.

He died in his home, Rocklands, in Gillies Avenue, Epsom, following an apoplectic seizure on 26 July 1889. Gillies's first wife, Catherine, died in 1865; he married secondly, in 1867, Agnes (d. 1884), daughter of John Sinclair, of Glasgow, niece of Andrew Sinclair, second Colonial Secretary of New Zealand, and sister-in-law of David Bruce. He had six children altogether from both marriages.

== Publications ==
- Gillies, Thomas Bannatyne (1868). "Notes on Land and Fresh-water Shells Collected in the Northern Part of the Province of Auckland, During the Month of April, 1868". Proceedings of the Auckland Institute: 60–61.
- Gillies, Thomas Bannatyne (1871). "Art. IX.—On the Occurrence of Footprints of the Moa at Poverty Bay". Transactions and Proceedings of the New Zealand Institute. 4: 127–128.
- Gillies, Thomas Bannatyne (1879). "Art. LIII.—Notes on the Growth of Certain Trees on Scoria Soil Near Mount Eden, Auckland". Transactions and Proceedings of the New Zealand Institute. 12: 357.
- Gillies, Thomas Bannatyne (1882). "Art. XXXIII.—Further Notes on Sorghum Experiments". Transactions and Proceedings of the New Zealand Institute. 15: 261–267.
- Gillies, Thomas Bannatyne (1882). "Art. XXXIV.—On the Growth of the Cork Oak in Auckland". Transactions and Proceedings of the New Zealand Institute. 15: 267.

== Sources ==
- Scholefield, Guy (1950) [First published in 1913]. New Zealand Parliamentary Record, 1840–1949 (3rd ed.). Wellington: Govt. Printer.
- Wilson, Jim (1985) [First published in 1913]. New Zealand Parliamentary Record, 1840–1984 (4th ed.). Wellington: V.R. Ward, Govt. Printer. OCLC 154283103.

Political offices
Preceded by Henry Sewell	Attorney-General; 1862	Succeeded by Henry Sewell
Preceded by Crosbie Ward	Postmaster-General; 1863–1864	Succeeded by John Richardson
Preceded by John Williamson	Superintendent of Auckland Province; 1869–1873	Succeeded by John Williamson
New Zealand Parliament
Preceded by William Cargill	Member of Parliament for Dunedin Country; 1860; Served alongside: John Parkin Taylor	Constituency abolished
New constituency	Member of Parliament for Bruce; 1861–1865; Served alongside: Charles Kettle, Edward Cargill	Succeeded by Arthur John Burns
Preceded by Thomas Ball	Member of Parliament for Mongonui; 1870	Succeeded by John McLeod
Preceded by Patrick Dignan	Member of Parliament for Auckland West; 1871–1875; Served alongside: John Williamson	Succeeded by George Grey
