= Thomas Ball (New Zealand politician) =

New Zealand politician

New Zealand Parliament
Years	Term	Electorate	Party
1866–1870	4th	Mongonui	Independent

Thomas Ball (28 February 1809 – 25 December 1897) was a New Zealand coloniser, landowner and politician. He was born in Brigg, Lincolnshire, England, on 28 February 1809.

He was a 19th-century Member of Parliament from Northland, New Zealand. He represented the Mongonui electorate from 1866 to 1870, when he resigned.

He died at Onehunga in 1897, having resided there for 18 years. He was buried at Purewa Cemetery.

New Zealand Parliament
Preceded by William Butler	Member of Parliament for Mongonui; 1866–1870	Succeeded by Thomas Gillies
