= Bruce (New Zealand electorate) =

Bruce was a rural parliamentary electorate in the Otago region of New Zealand, from 1861 to 1922. For part of the 1860s with the influx to Otago of gold-miners it was a multi-member constituency with two members.

== Population centres ==
In 1865 the Bruce electorate included Tokomairiro, Waihola, East Taieri, suburbs of Dunedin, Inch Clutha, Lawrence, Warepa and Pomahaka.

== History ==
The Bruce electorate was formed in the 1860 electoral redistribution. It covered the rural area surrounding Dunedin that had previously been part of the Dunedin Country electorate. The Bruce electorate was a two-member constituency. The electorate was named after Robert the Bruce who was King of Scotland from 1306 to 1329.

Charles Kettle and Thomas Gillies were the only two candidates for the newly constituted two-member electorate of Bruce. They were thus declared elected unopposed on 11 February 1861.

Kettle died on 5 June 1862. Edward Cargill succeeded him in the 1862 by-election.

Thomas Gillies resigned in 1865 and the subsequent by-election was contested by William John Dyer and Arthur John Burns. On 8 April 1865, Burns and Dyer received 102 and 78 votes. Burns was thus declared elected.

Later in 1865, Edward Cargill resigned. The resulting by-election, held on 26 July, was contested by James Macandrew and John Cargill. Macandrew and J. Cargill received 207 and 34 votes, and Macandrew was declared elected.

From the 1866 general election, Bruce was a single-member electorate. John Cargill was its first representative, and he resigned in 1870. James Clark Brown won the 1870 by-election on 21 March. Brown stood for Tuapeka in the 1871 general election. William Murray won the 1871 election for Bruce, was confirmed in 1876 and 1879, but defeated in 1881 by James Rutherford, who died in 1883. James McDonald won the 1883 by-election, but was defeated at the 1884 general election.

Robert Gillies won the 1884 general election, but resigned on 30 June 1885. Donald Reid won the resulting 1885 by-election, but was defeated at the 1887 general election by Crawford Anderson. He retired at the end of the term, and the 1890 general election was won by James William Thomson, who resigned again in 1892.

The later Defence Minister James Allen won the 1892 by-election and held the seat until 1920, when he resigned. John Edie was successful in the 1920 by-election, and when the electorate was abolished in 1922, he successfully stood for Clutha.

== Members of Parliament ==
Bruce was represented by 16 Members of Parliament.

Key:

Independent Conservative Reform Liberal

=== 1861 to 1866 ===
Bruce was a two-member electorate from 1861 to 1866.

Election	Winner	
1861 election	Charles Kettle	Thomas Gillies
1862 by-election	Edward Cargill	Thomas Gillies
April 1865 by-election	Edward Cargill	Arthur John Burns
July 1865 by-election	James Macandrew	Arthur John Burns

=== 1866 to 1922 ===
From 1866 to 1922, Bruce was a single-member electorate.

Election	Winner
1866 election	John Cargill
1870 by-election	James Clark Brown
1871 election	William Murray
1876 election	William Murray
1879 election	William Murray
1881 election	James Rutherford
1883 by-election	James McDonald
1884 election	Robert Gillies
1885 by-election	Donald Reid
1887 election	Crawford Anderson
1890 election	James William Thomson
1892 by-election	James Allen
1893 election	James Allen
1896 election	James Allen
1899 election	James Allen
1902 election	James Allen
1905 election	James Allen
1908 election	James Allen
1911 election	James Allen
1914 election	James Allen
1919 election	James Allen
1920 by-election	John Edie
(Electorate abolished 1922; see Clutha)

== Election results ==
=== 1920 by-election ===
1920 Bruce by-election
Party	Candidate	Votes	%	±%
Liberal	John Edie	2,421	51.14	+2.22
Reform	James Begg	2,297	48.52	
Informal votes		16	0.33	−0.87
Majority		124	2.61	
Turnout		4,734	63.92	−16.28
Registered electors		7,406		

=== 1919 election ===
1919 general election: Bruce
Party	Candidate	Votes	%	±%
Reform	James Allen	2,993	51.08	
Liberal	John Edie	2,867	48.92	
Informal votes		71	1.20	
Majority		126	2.15	
Turnout		5,931	80.20	
Registered electors		7,395		

=== 1899 election ===
1899 general election: Bruce
Party	Candidate	Votes	%	±%
Conservative	James Allen	1,966	55.10	
Liberal	Crawford Anderson	1,602	44.90	
Majority		364	10.20	
Turnout		3,568	76.48	
Registered electors		4,665		

=== 1892 by-election ===
1892 Bruce by-election
Party	Candidate	Votes	%	±%
Conservative	James Allen	1,085	66.85	
Liberal	Alfred Lee Smith	538	33.14	
Majority		547	33.70	
Turnout		1,623	75.06	
Registered electors		2,162		

=== 1890 election ===
1890 general election: Bruce
Party	Candidate	Votes	%	±%
Conservative	James William Thomson	872	69.76	
Conservative	James Smith	378	30.24	
Majority		494	39.51	
Turnout		1,250	59.80	
Registered electors		2,090		

=== 1885 by-election ===
1885 Bruce by-election
Party	Candidate	Votes	%	±%
Independent	Donald Reid	336	31.61	
Independent	James McDonald	327	30.76	
Independent	Crawford Anderson	303	28.50	
Independent	William Hutchison	97	9.13	
Majority		9	0.85	
Turnout		1063		

=== 1883 by-election ===
1883 Bruce by-election
Party	Candidate	Votes	%	±%
Independent	James McDonald	472	46.64	
Independent	Robert Gillies	451	44.57	
Independent	William A. Mosley	89	8.79	
Majority		21	2.08	
Turnout		1136		

=== 1871 election ===
1871 general election: Bruce
Party	Candidate	Votes	%	±%
Independent	William Murray	131	40.43	
Independent	William John Dyer	90	27.78	
Independent	William Cutten	72	22.22	
Independent	William Black	31	9.57	
Majority		41	12.65	
Turnout		324	60.79	
Registered electors		533		

=== July 1865 by-election ===
July 1865 Bruce by-election
Party	Candidate	Votes	%	±%
Independent	James Macandrew	207	85.89	
Independent	John Cargill	34	14.11	
Majority		173	71.78	
Turnout		241	48.20	
Registered electors		500		

=== April 1865 by-election ===
April 1865 Bruce by-election
Party	Candidate	Votes	%	±%
Independent	Arthur John Burns	102	56.67	
Independent	William John Dyer	78	43.33	
Majority		24	13.33	
Turnout		180	36.00	
Registered electors		500		

=== 1862 by-election ===
1862 Bruce by-election
Party	Candidate	Votes	%	±%
Independent	Edward Cargill	74	57.81	
Independent	William Baldwin	54	42.19	
Turnout		128		
Majority		20		
