= Superintendent (New Zealand) =

Head of a provincial council in New Zealand

Superintendent was the elected head of each provincial council in New Zealand from 1853 to 1876.

== History ==
Provinces existed in New Zealand from 1841 until 1876 as a form of sub-national government. After the initial provinces pre-1853, new provinces were formed by the New Zealand Constitution Act 1852. This act established the first six provinces of Auckland, New Plymouth, Wellington, Nelson, Canterbury, and Otago. Other provinces were established later. Each province elected its own legislature known as a provincial council, and elected a superintendent who was not a member of the council. The elections for council and superintendent were not necessarily held at the same time.

Following abolition, the provinces became known as provincial districts. Their only visible function today is their use to determine, with the exception of the Chatham Islands, Northland, and South Canterbury, the geographical boundaries for anniversary day public holidays.

== Role of superintendents ==
The provincial councils and the House of Representatives were "locked into a battle of supremacy that would last for 20 years." The 1852 constitution defined thirteen areas where law making was reserved for the House of Representatives: customs, post-office, shipping dues, lighthouses, weights and measures, currency, bankruptcy, judiciary, marriage, Crown lands and native land (i.e. lands held by Māori), criminal law, and inheritance law. For a variety of reasons, the provincial councils were more effective than the national Parliament. Initially, this was partially because Parliament was made up of strong personalities with strong and differing regional interests, who had no prior experience of acting for the greater good of the country as a whole. Consequently, the role of a provincial superintendent was more highly regarded than those of members of Parliament.

The constitution had given the governor substantial powers over the provincial councils, but many anomalies resulted in an increase in the power of the superintendents. The governor could dissolve the provincial council at any time, veto its enactments, or remove the superintendent from office if voted by the majority of provincial councillors or disallow the superintendent's elections (the latter two both within three month of the superintendent's election). However, only superintendents had the power to convene a provincial council, and by simply delaying the first meeting beyond the three months threshold, much of the power of the governor was negated. So in practice, superintendents were more powerful than had been anticipated by the constitution.

Another practicality was that Parliament had long breaks between sessions due to the difficulty of travel at the time. In one instance, the Wellington Provincial Council passed an act that empowered itself to raise a £25,000 loan. By the time Parliament next convened and repealed the act, the loan had already been effected and could not be undone.

Hence, the role of the superintendents went much beyond the act of presiding over a provincial council. The post came with a lot of honour and responsibility.

== Elections of superintendents ==
To be eligible to vote in the provincial (or national) elections, voters had to be male owners of property valued at £50, or leasehold valued at £10. The election for superintendent, to be held every four years, was a major event in the provinces for weeks and months leading up to it. It was such an exciting event that even the children of that time could remember it later in their adult lives.

It was not uncommon that newspapers would be founded with the purpose of supporting a candidate and attacking the opponent. The Press, for example, these days the largest newspaper in the South Island, was founded by James FitzGerald (1st Superintendent of Canterbury) to oppose the Lyttelton Rail Tunnel proposal by his opponent William Sefton Moorhouse (2nd Superintendent of Canterbury). Moorhouse had tried to use the Lyttelton Times for this purpose, a newspaper that he was the first editor of in 1851 but no longer had control over, but that newspaper backed the Moorhouse tunnel.

The electors' excitement stemmed from the fact that the outcome of an election might significantly impact on their district; where one candidate might have promised a school, roads and bridges, another candidate might not deliver the same for their locality.

Amongst other things, taxation, education, charitable aid and temperance were important issues back then. Initially, an open voting system was used, where those enrolled would tell the electoral officer their choice of candidate, who would note this on the electoral role. All of this was reasonably public, and unofficial tallies of the count would circulate. These tallies may well have been adjusted to suit a particular outcome. For example, where more than two candidates stood for election, a preferred candidate might be shown as so far behind that the remaining voters may be encouraged to vote for another candidate, in order to prevent the unwanted rival from gaining office. These unofficial tallies were still circulated after voting at the ballot box had been introduced.

Drunkenness, fighting and the throwing of flour bags and rotten eggs on election day were common.

== List of superintendents ==
From 1853 to 1876, New Zealand had 41 superintendents across its ten provinces.

=== Auckland Province ===
The Auckland Province had nine superintendents:

- 1853 Robert Henry Wynyard
- 1855 William Brown
- 1855 Logan Campbell
- 1856 John Williamson (1st time)
- 1862 Robert Graham
- 1865 Frederick Whitaker
- 1867 John Williamson (2nd time)
- 1869 Thomas Bannatyne Gillies
- 1873 John Williamson (3rd time)
- 1875 George O'Rorke
- 1875 Sir George Grey

=== Canterbury Province ===
The Canterbury Province had four superintendents:

- 20 Jul 1853 – Oct 1857 James FitzGerald
- 24 Oct 1857 – Feb 1863 William Sefton Moorhouse (1st time)
- Mar 1863 – May 1866 Samuel Bealey
- 30 May 1866 – May 1868 William Sefton Moorhouse (2nd time)
- 22 May 1868 – 1 Jan 1877 William Rolleston

=== Hawke's Bay Province ===
The Hawke's Bay Province had four superintendents:

- 23 Apr 1859 – Mar 1861 Thomas Henry Fitzgerald
- 8 Apr 1861 – 5 Dec 1862 John Chilton Lambton Carter
- 26 Feb 1863 – 23 Sep 1869 Donald McLean
- 24 Sep 1869 – 1 Jan 1877 John Davies Ormond

=== Marlborough Province ===
The Marlborough Province had five superintendents:

- 1860 William Adams
- 1861 Captain Baillie
- 1863 Thomas Carter
- 1864 Arthur Seymour (1st time)
- 1865 William Henry Eyes
- 1870 Arthur Seymour (2nd time)

=== Nelson Province ===
The Nelson Province had four superintendents:

- 1853 Edward Stafford
- 1856 John Perry Robinson
- Jan–Mar 1865 John Barnicoat (Acting)
- 1865 Alfred Saunders
- 1867 Oswald Curtis

=== Otago Province ===
The Otago Province had five superintendents:

- 1853 William Cargill
- 1860 James Macandrew (1st time)
- 1861 John Richardson
- 1863 John Hyde Harris
- 1865 Thomas Dick
- 1867 James Macandrew (2nd time)

=== Southland Province ===
The Southland Province had three superintendents:

- 1861 James Alexander Robertson Menzies
- 1865 John Parkin Taylor
- 1869 William Wood

=== Taranaki Province ===
The Taranaki Province (initially called the New Plymouth Province) had four superintendents:

- 1853–1857 Charles Brown (1st time)
- 1857–1861 George Cutfield
- 1861–1865 Charles Brown (2nd time)
- 1865–1869 Henry Richmond
- 1869–1876 Frederic Carrington

=== Wellington Province ===
The Wellington Province had two superintendents:

- 2 July 1853 – 14 March 1870 Isaac Featherston
- 28 April 1871 – 1 January 1877 William Fitzherbert

=== Westland Province ===
The Westland Province had one superintendent:

- 1874 James Bonar
