= Wyndham, New Zealand =

Wyndham Mokoreta (Māori)
- Town
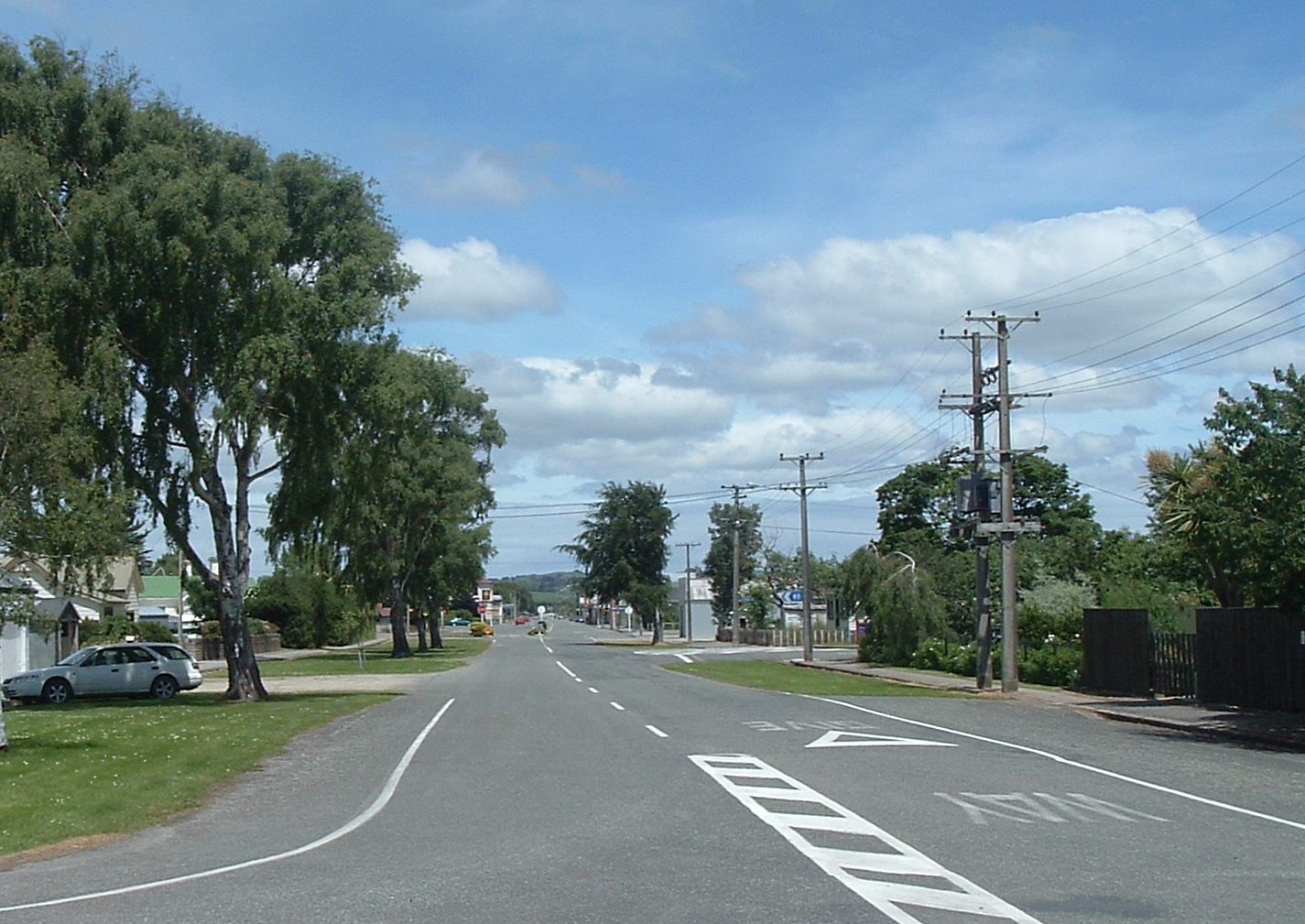
- Balaclava Street, Wyndham
- Interactive map of Wyndham
- Coordinates: 46°20′S 168°51′E
- Country: New Zealand
- Region: Southland region
- Territorial authorities of New Zealand: Southland District
- Ward: Waihopai-Toetoe Ward
- Community board: Waihopai-Toetoe Community
- Electorates: Invercargill; Te Tai Tonga (Māori)

Government
  - Territorial authority: Southland District Council
  - Regional council: Southland Regional Council
  - Mayor of Southland: Rob Scott
  - Invercargill MP: Penny Simmonds
  - Te Tai Tonga MP: Tākuta Ferris

Area
  - Total: 2.95 km^{2} (1.14 sq mi)

Population (June 2025)
  - Total: 620
  - Density: 210/km^{2} (540/sq mi)

Wyndham is a rural town of 579 people in the South Island of New Zealand in the Southland region, 45 km (28 mi) east of Invercargill and 25 km (15 mi) south of Gore. The original Māori name of the locality was Mokoreta (clear or sweet water).

The name "Wyndham" was first used in the district when John Anderson named his runs 161 and 162 Upper Windham Station and Lower Windham Station in 1857. The name was soon mis-spelt to its more common form and the Mokoreta river also became known as the Wyndham river. The town was then named in 1869 for the adjacent river, so indirectly named for General Sir Charles Ash Windham who fought in the Crimean War. The streets are in turn named for events, places, battles and personalities from that war. The town was initially surveyed in 1869 and gazetted a town district in 1882.

Wyndham is situated on the east banks of the Mataura River, between the Mimihau Stream to the north and the Wyndham (Mokoreta) River to the south. Protected now by a stopbank, Wyndham is a service centre for the surrounding districts with a shopping centre, library, museum (now shut down because of earthquake issues) and a hotel. For eighty years, it was served by the Wyndham Branch railway which provided a connection with the Main South Line, and for forty years, an extension past Wyndham was operated to Glenham.

A recreational area has a golf course, race course, rugby ground, softball diamond, bowling green, tennis/netball courts and camping ground. Brown trout fishing is within walking distance as well.

The town used to host the Wyndham street races as part of the Burt Munro Challenge, Wyndham one day street racing event of the week-long calendar. The biggest current gathering of motorcycle enthusiasts in the Southern Hemisphere.

Wyndham originally had a dairy factory established in 1885 and a flax milling factory named The Field-Gibson Flax Milling Company established in 1903, but these have both long since closed.

== Demographics ==
Wyndham is described by Statistics New Zealand as a rural settlement and covers 2.95 km^{2} (1.14 sq mi). It had an estimated population of 620 as of June 2025, with a population density of 210 people per km^{2}. It is part of the larger Wyndham-Catlins statistical area.

Historical population
Year	Pop.	±% p.a.
2006	528	—
2013	552	+0.64%
2018	579	+0.96%

Wyndham had a population of 579 at the 2018 New Zealand census, an increase of 27 people (4.9%) since the 2013 census, and an increase of 51 people (9.7%) since the 2006 census. There were 234 households, comprising 297 males and 279 females, giving a sex ratio of 1.06 males per female, with 102 people (17.6%) aged under 15 years, 84 (14.5%) aged 15 to 29, 261 (45.1%) aged 30 to 64, and 123 (21.2%) aged 65 or older.

Ethnicities were 86.0% European/Pākehā, 19.2% Māori, 3.1% Pasifika, 1.6% Asian, and 1.0% other ethnicities. People may identify with more than one ethnicity.

Although some people chose not to answer the census's question about religious affiliation, 46.6% had no religion, 38.3% were Christian, 0.5% had Māori religious beliefs, 0.5% were Hindu, 1.0% were Buddhist and 2.1% had other religions.

Of those at least 15 years old, 42 (8.8%) people had a bachelor's or higher degree, and 147 (30.8%) people had no formal qualifications. 48 people (10.1%) earned over $70,000 compared to 17.2% nationally. The employment status of those at least 15 was that 222 (46.5%) people were employed full-time, 78 (16.4%) were part-time, and 15 (3.1%) were unemployed.

== Education ==
Wyndham has a primary school, Wyndham Primary School, which educates students between year zero and year six. It had a roll of 135 students as of July 2026. The first school in Wyndham was a private school which opened in 1875, and a public school started in 1877. The present school opened in 1885.

Situated directly beside the primary school is Menzies College, Wyndham's secondary school. Menzies College has 345 students who range from year seven to year thirteen. Around 1950s the place was burnt in a fire and, in 1993, a large section of the junior school block was destroyed by fire, rooms 3 to 6 and the Form 7 common room were all destroyed as well as surrounding resource rooms. In 1924, a secondary department was created for Wyndham School and called Wyndham District High School. This became Menzies College in 1971.
