= William Cargill (New Zealand politician) =

19th-century New Zealand politician

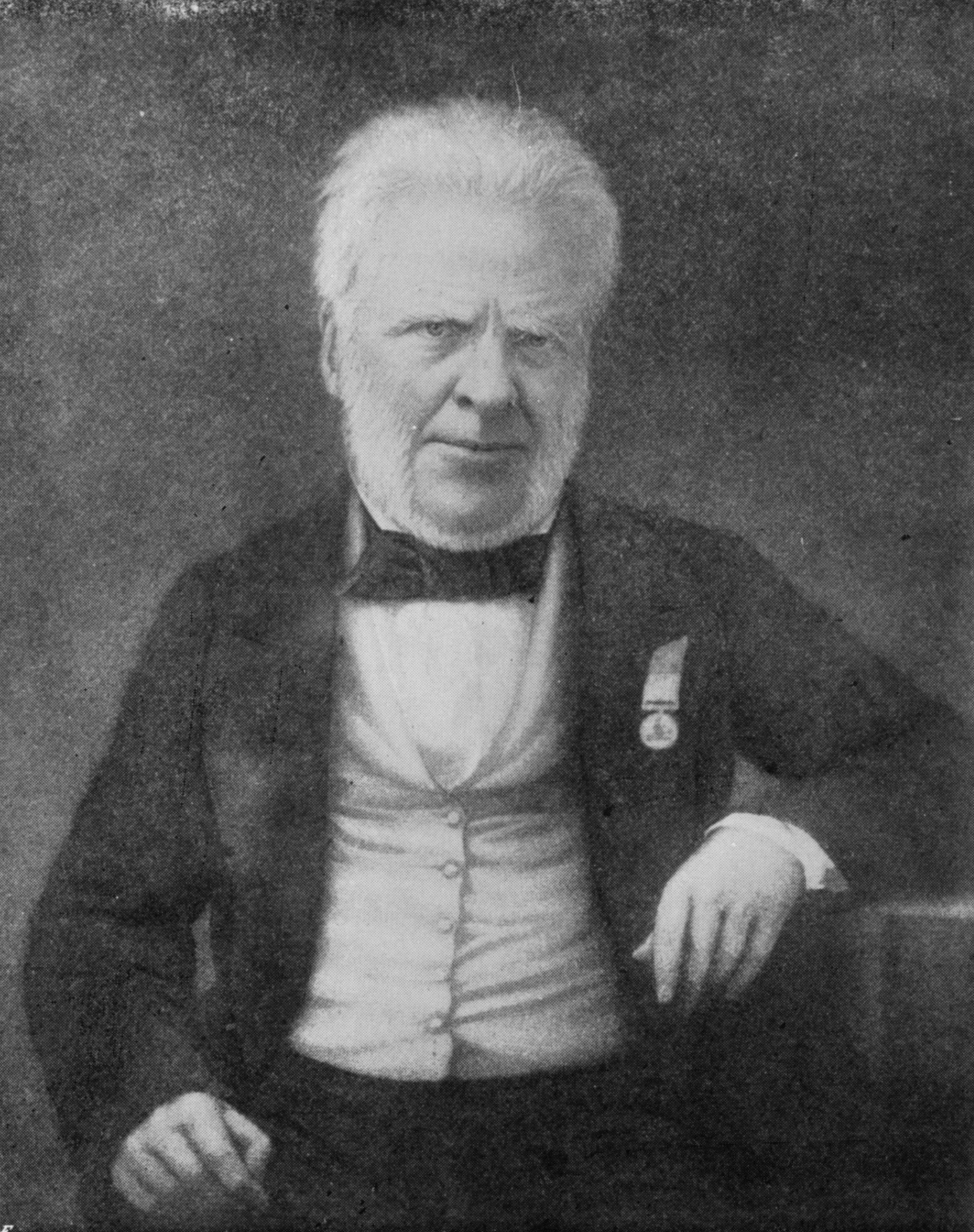
- Cargill, c. 1850s

1st Superintendent of Otago Province
- In office 1853 – October 1859

Member of the New Zealand Parliament for Dunedin Country
- In office 1855 – October 1859

Personal details
- Born: William Walter Cargill; 27 August 1784 Edinburgh, Midlothian, Scotland
- Died: 6 August 1860 (aged 75) Dunedin, New Zealand
- Spouse: Mary Ann Yates (m. 1813)
- Children: 17
- Relatives: John Cargill (son); Edward Cargill (son)
- Profession: Soldier, merchant, coloniser, politician

William Walter Cargill (27 August 1784 – 6 August 1860) was the founder of the Otago settlement in New Zealand, after serving as an officer in the British Army. He was a member of parliament and Otago's first Superintendent.

== Early life ==
Cargill was born in Edinburgh, Scotland, in 1784. His parents were James Cargill and Marrion Jamieson. His father died of alcoholism when William was 15. He joined the British Army in 1802 and served with distinction in India, Spain, and France. In 1813, he married Mary Ann Yates and they went on to have seventeen children. Of these, two of his five sons became notable in public life: John, who followed in his father's footsteps and became a politician, and Edward, a prominent businessman and politician. Family circumstances forced him to sell his commission in 1820, though he was later referred to as "Captain Cargill". After leaving the army, he became a wine merchant in Scotland.

On 24 November 1847, Cargill sailed for New Zealand on the ship John Wickliffe, arriving at what is now Port Chalmers, Otago on 23 March 1848.

== Political career ==
New Zealand Parliament
Years	Term	Electorate	Party
1855–1859	2nd	Dunedin Country	Independent

The New Zealand Constitution Act 1852 granted the settler population self-government, and in 1853 Cargill was elected Superintendent of the Otago Province. Cargill also served as a Member of Parliament for Dunedin Country. He was elected unopposed on 11 December 1855. He served the multi-member electorate alongside his son John. He rarely spoke in the house and found travel to parliament in Auckland difficult. Aged 75, he announced his resignation from public office in October 1859; he died less than a year later. He was described as a "unabashed provincialist".

== Death and legacy ==
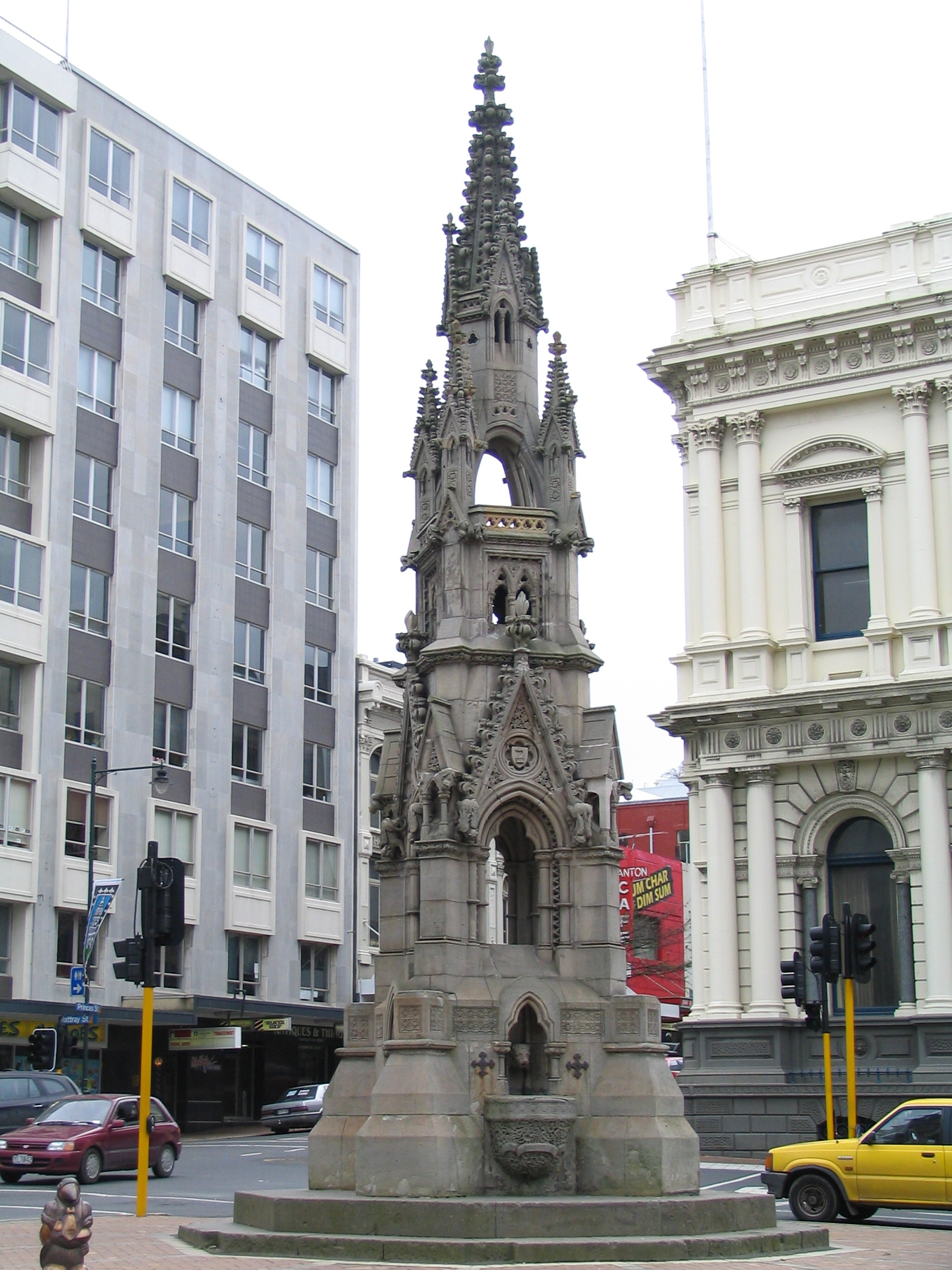
Cargill's Monument on Princes Street in Dunedin

Cargill died of a stroke on 6 August 1860, at his home "Hillside" in Dunedin, and is buried in Dunedin Southern Cemetery with his wife and three children.

His granddaughter Isabel Cargill travelled to Italy with Ann Marie Babington and in 1893 they opened Babington's tea room on the Spanish Steps in Rome which still today belongs to her descendants.

Numerous names have connections with Cargill. The city of Invercargill is named in honour of him (Inver coming from the Scots Gaelic word inbhir meaning a river's mouth), as is Mount Cargill, which towers above northern Dunedin. "Cargill's Corner" is a major road intersection in South Dunedin, and one of the roads which crosses at it is Hillside Road, named for Cargill's house. A Tasmanian sandstone monument to Cargill, simply known as the Cargill Monument, was built in Dunedin in 1863–64.

Cargill's Castle, a ruined stately home above St Clair is named after his son Edward.

Political offices
First	Superintendent of Otago Province; 1853–1859	Succeeded by James Macandrew
New Zealand Parliament
Preceded by William Cutten	Dunedin Country; 1855–1859; Served alongside: John Cargill, John Parkin Taylor	Succeeded by Thomas Gillies
