= Otago Province =

Former province of New Zealand (1853–1876)

Coordinates: 45.46412°S 169.86977°E

- Provinces of New Zealand
- Otago Province within New Zealand
- Country: New Zealand
- Island: South Island
- Established: 1853
- Abolished: 1876
- Named for: Māori: Ōtākou
- Seat: Dunedin

The Otago Province was a province of New Zealand until the abolition of provincial government in 1876. The capital of the province was Dunedin. Southland Province split from Otago in 1861, but became part of the province again in 1870.

== Area and history ==
Otago Province was one of the six original provinces established in New Zealand in 1853. It covered the lower third of the South Island. Its northern neighbour was the Canterbury Province, and the boundary was the Waitaki River from the Pacific Ocean to its source in the Southern Alps, and from there a straight line to Awarua Bay (now known as Big Bay) on the west coast. The inland area of the Waitaki catchment was unexplored in 1853 and dispute later arose over which branch of the Waitaki should form the boundary. The boundary was delineated in 1861 as following the Ōhau River to Lake Ōhau and from there a straight line to Mount Aspiring and Awarua Bay.

Southland Province split from Otago in 1861, but became part of the province again in 1870. All the New Zealand provinces were abolished at the end of 1876.

== Anniversary Day ==
New Zealand law provides an anniversary day for each province. Otago Anniversary Day is a public holiday each year on the Monday nearest to 23 March.

== Superintendents ==
The Otago Province had five Superintendents:

No.	from	to	Superintendent
1	26 Dec 1853	Dec 1859	William Cargill
2	3 Jan 1860	6 Mar 1861	James Macandrew
3	17 May 1861	15 Apr 1863	John Richardson
4	16 Apr 1863	23 Jun 1865	John Hyde Harris
5	4 Aug 1865	26 Feb 1867	Thomas Dick
	27 Feb 1867	1 Jan 1877	James Macandrew (2nd time)

== Railways ==
The Province built the Port Chalmers Branch under the auspices of the Dunedin and Port Chalmers Railway Company Limited, and was built to the recently adopted national track gauge of 1067 mm (3 feet 6 inches), and it was the first line in the country with that gauge to open, on 1 January 1873. The first locomotive to run on the line was the E class Josephine, a double Fairlie steam locomotive, whose local popularity ensured she was retained beyond her retirement from service on the railways in 1917 and is preserved today in the Otago Settlers Museum in Dunedin.

When the Southland province amalgamated with Otago in 1870, the latter acquired the former province's railways - which were built to the standard gauge of 1,435 mm (4 feet 8.5 inches).

== Legislation ==
- Otago Harbour Trust Leasing Ordinance 1862
- Education Reserves Ordinance 1864
- Education Reserves Ordinance 1865
- Harbour Reclaimed Lands Sale and Leasing Ordinance 1868
- University of Otago Ordinance 1869
- Dunedin Athenaeum and Mechanics' Institute Ordinance 1870, establishing the Dunedin Athenaeum and Mechanics' Institute
- Oamaru Racecourse Reserve Management Ordinance 1870
- University of Otago Endowment Ordinance 1870
- Blueskin Market Reserve Ordinance 1871
- Invercargill Athenaeum Reserve Management Ordinance 1871
- Northern Agricultural and Pastoral Reserve Management Ordinance 1871
- Lawrence Athenaeum and Mining Institute Ordinance 1872
- Lawrence Athenaeum and Mining Institute Reserves Management Ordinance 1872
- Oamaru Town Reserves Management Ordinance 1872
- Cromwell Athenaeum Ordinance 1873
- Dempsey Trust Ordinance 1873
- Invercargill Athenaeum Reserves Management Ordinance 1873
- Riverton Athenaeum Ordinance 1873
- Winton Racecourse Reserve Management Ordinance 1873
- Caledonian Society of Otago Incorporation Ordinance 1874
- Roslyn Institute Ordinance 1874
- Arrowtown Athenaeum Ordinance 1875
- Invercargill Athenaeum Reserve Management Ordinance 1875
- Riverton Athenaeum Reserves Management Ordinance 1875
- University of Otago Lands Trust Ordinance 1875

== See also ==
- Otago gold rush
- Vincent Pyke
- 1853 New Zealand provincial elections
