= 1909 in New Zealand =

- Decades: 1880s; 1890s; 1900s; 1910s; 1920s
- See also: History of New Zealand; List of years in New Zealand; Timeline of New Zealand history

The following lists events that happened during 1909 in New Zealand.

== Incumbents ==
=== Regal and viceregal ===
- Head of State – Edward VII
- Governor – The Lord Plunket GCMG KCVO

== Government ==
The 11th New Zealand Parliament commenced.

- Speaker of the House – Sir Arthur Guinness
- Prime Minister – Joseph Ward
- Minister of Finance – Joseph Ward
- Attorney-General – John Findlay
- Chief Justice – Sir Robert Stout

=== Parliamentary opposition ===
Leader of the Opposition – William Massey (independent until February and thereafter as leader of the Reform Party)

=== Main centre leaders ===
- Mayor of Auckland – Arthur Myers then Charles Grey
- Mayor of Wellington – Alfred Newman
- Mayor of Christchurch – Charles Allison
- Mayor of Dunedin – John McDonald then James Walker

== Events ==
- 1 January: The Quackery Prevention Act 1908 becomes law, preventing false advertising in relation to ingredients, composition, structure, nature or operation of a medicine.
- 12 February: Inter-island steamer SS Penguin is wrecked at Cape Terawhiti in Cook Strait with the loss of 75 lives.
- 14 February: The first North Island Main Trunk passenger express train leaves Auckland for Wellington, an overnight trip scheduled to take 19 hours 15 minutes, with a sleeping car, day cars with reclining seats, postal/parcels vans, and a dining car for part of the way.

=== Undated ===
- The Canterbury (NZ) Aero Club, the first in New Zealand, is formed by George Bolt.

== Arts and literature ==
See 1909 in art, 1909 in literature

=== Music ===
See: 1909 in music

=== Film ===
See: 1909 in film, List of New Zealand feature films, Cinema of New Zealand, Category:1909 films

== Sport ==
=== Boxing ===
National amateur champions

- Heavyweight – M. Ryan (Invercargill)
- Middleweight – S. Monaghan (Ohakune)
- Welterweight – G. Watchorn (Palmerston North)
- Lightweight – J. Finnerty (Invercargill)
- Featherweight – J. Hagerty (Timaru)
- Bantamweight – C. Stewart (Timaru)

=== Chess ===
- The 22nd National Chess Championship was held in Dunedin, and was won by F.K. Kelling of Wellington.

=== Golf ===
- The third New Zealand Open championship was won by J.A. Clements (his second consecutive win).
- The 17th National Amateur Championships were held in Auckland
  - Men: Arthur Duncan (Wellington) – 6th title
  - Women: Mrs ? Bevan.

=== Horse racing ===
==== Harness racing ====
- New Zealand Trotting Cup: Wildwood Junior
- Auckland Trotting Cup: Havoc

=== Rugby league ===
New Zealand national rugby league team

=== Rugby union ===
- Auckland defend the Ranfurly Shield only once, beating Taranaki 18–5

=== Soccer ===
Provincial league champions:

- Auckland: Auckland Corinthians
- Canterbury: Burnham Industrial School
- Otago: Dunedin City
- Southland: Murihiku
- Taranaki: Kaponga
- Wellington: Wellington Swifts

=== Tennis ===
- Anthony Wilding and Australian Norman Brookes, as the Australasian team, successfully defend the Davis Cup, beating the United States 5–0. The final is held in Sydney.
- Anthony Wilding wins the men's singles at the Australian Open.

== Births ==
- 15 April: Jack Watts, politician. (d. 1970)
- 18 April: Tom Skinner, politician, Federation of Labour president. (d. 1991)
- 20 May: Bill Pratney, cyclist. (d. 2001)
- 13 June: Ralph Hanan, politician. (d. 1969)
- 14 July: Brian Shorland, organic chemist. (d. 1999)
- 27 July: Charles Brasch, poet and literary editor. (d. 1973)
- 20 August: Alby Roberts, cricketer. (d. 1978)
- 15 September: Jean Batten, aviator. (d. 1982)
- 16 September: Rod MacKenzie, rugby union player (d. 2000)
- 31 October: Frank Bateson, astronomer. (d. 2007)
- 23 December: Don Cleverley, cricketer. (d. 2004)

== Deaths ==
- 14 February: Elsie Dohrmann, scholar, teacher and temperance campaigner
- 28 April: John Wilson (businessman), businessman and judge
- 7 August: Arthur Remington, politician
- 14 August: Samuel Brown, Mayor of Wellington.
- Maria Sophia Pope, shopkeeper and businesswoman.

== See also ==
- History of New Zealand
- List of years in New Zealand
- Military history of New Zealand
- Timeline of New Zealand history
- Timeline of New Zealand's links with Antarctica
- Timeline of the New Zealand environment
