= 1906 in New Zealand =

- Decades: 1880s; 1890s; 1900s; 1910s; 1920s
- See also: History of New Zealand; List of years in New Zealand; Timeline of New Zealand history

The following lists events that happened during 1906 in New Zealand.

== Incumbents ==
=== Regal and viceregal ===
- Head of State – Edward VII
- Governor – The Lord Plunket GCMG KCVO

=== Government ===
- Speaker of the House – Arthur Guinness (Liberal)
- Prime Minister – Richard Seddon (until 10 June) then William Hall-Jones (until 6 August), then Joseph Ward (all Liberal)
- Minister of Finance – Richard Seddon (until 10 June) then William Hall-Jones (until 6 August), then Joseph Ward
- Attorney-General – Albert Pitt (until 18 Nov) then John Findlay (both Liberal)
- Chief Justice – Sir Robert Stout

=== Parliamentary opposition ===
- Leader of the Opposition – William Massey, (Independent).

=== Main centre leaders ===
- Mayor of Auckland – Arthur Myers
- Mayor of Wellington – Thomas Hislop
- Mayor of Christchurch – Charles Gray then John Hall
- Mayor of Dunedin – Joseph Braithwaite then George Lawrence

== Events ==
=== April ===
- 25 April
  - The 1906 Auckland City mayoral election is held.
  - The 1906 Wellington City mayoral election is held.

=== June ===
- 10 June: Prime Minister Richard Seddon dies suddenly in office, ending a 13-year premiership.
- The 1906 New Zealand Liberal Party leadership election is held.

=== July ===
- 13 July: The 1906 Westland by-election is held.

=== August ===
- 6 August: Joseph Ward is sworn in as prime minister, taking over from acting prime minister William Hall-Jones.

=== November ===
- 1 November: The International Exhibition begins in Hagley Park, Christchurch.

=== December ===
- 6 December: The 1906 Manukau by-election is held.

== Arts and literature ==
See 1906 in art, 1906 in literature

=== Music ===
See: 1906 in music

=== Film ===
See: Category:1906 film awards, 1906 in film, List of New Zealand feature films, Cinema of New Zealand, Category:1906 films

== Sport ==
=== Boxing ===
National amateur champions

- Heavyweight – E. Pearson (Wellington)
- Middleweight – A. Nash (Christchurch)
- Lightweight – R. Mayze (Christchurch)
- Featherweight – J. Godfrey (Auckland)
- Bantamweight – B. Tracy (Wellington)

=== Chess ===
- The 19th National Championship was held in Auckland, and was won by R.J. Barnes of Wellington, his 5th title.

=== Golf ===
The 8th National Amateur Championships were held in Christchurch

- Men: S.H. Gollan (Napier) – 2nd title
- Women: Mrs Bidwell – 2nd title

=== Horse racing ===
==== Harness racing ====
- New Zealand Trotting Cup: Belmont M.
- Auckland Trotting Cup: Typewriter

=== Rugby ===
- Ranfurly Shield – Auckland successfully defend the shield all season, with wins against Canterbury (29–6), Taranaki (18–5), Southland (48–12) and Wellington (11–5).

=== Soccer ===
Provincial league champions:

- Auckland: North Shore AFC
- Canterbury: Christchurch Club
- Otago: Northern
- Southland: Nightcaps
- Taranaki: Eltham
- Wellington: Diamond Wellington

=== Tennis ===
- Anthony Wilding wins both the singles and doubles (with Rodney Heath) titles at the Australian Open.

== Births ==
- 19 January: Robin Hyde, poet and novelist
- 27 February: Mal Matheson, cricketer
- 5 April: Ted Morgan, Olympic boxer
- 4 July: Leo Lemuel White, photographer, photojournalist, aviator, publisher and writer
- 8 August: John Hutton, artist

Category:1906 births

== Deaths ==
- 26 January: Fred Sutton, politician.
- 10 June: Richard Seddon, 15th Prime Minister of New Zealand (died in office)
- 28 June: Jacob William Heberley, carver.
- 6 August: George Waterhouse, 7th Premier of New Zealand (died in UK)
- 21 September: Joseph Dransfield, Mayor of Wellington and politician.
- 29 October; Henry Jackson, politician
- 18 November: Albert Pitt, politician.

== See also ==
- History of New Zealand
- List of years in New Zealand
- Military history of New Zealand
- Timeline of New Zealand history
- Timeline of New Zealand's links with Antarctica
- Timeline of the New Zealand environment
