= 1911 in New Zealand =

- Decades: 1890s; 1900s; 1910s; 1920s; 1930s
- See also: History of New Zealand; List of years in New Zealand; Timeline of New Zealand history

The following lists events that happened during 1911 in New Zealand.

== Incumbents ==
=== Regal and viceregal ===
- Head of State – George V
- Governor – The Lord Islington GCMG GBE DSO PC

=== Government ===
- Speaker of the House – Arthur Guinness (Liberal)
- Prime Minister – Joseph Ward (Liberal)
- Minister of Finance – Joseph Ward
- Chief Justice – Sir Robert Stout

=== Parliamentary opposition ===
Leader of the Opposition – William Massey (Reform Party).

=== Main centre leaders ===
- Mayor of Auckland – Lemuel Bagnall, then James Parr
- Mayor of Wellington – Thomas Wilford
- Mayor of Christchurch – Charles Allison, then Tommy Taylor, then John Joseph Dougall
- Mayor of Dunedin – Thomas Cole, then William Burnett

== Events ==
- The Marlborough Herald ceases publication. It began in 1905.
- 30 January: The final race meeting at which bookmakers are allowed on New Zealand racecourses.
- 5 February: The first officially recorded powered aeroplane flight in New Zealand. The Walsh Brothers' Howard Wright biplane Manurewa makes its first flight at Glenora Park, Papakura near Auckland. The plane is capable of carrying a passenger and almost certainly did so before the end of the year.
- 1 June: Women could no longer be employed as barmaids (with exemptions for existing barmaids and for relations of publicans).
- 23 December: George Bolt's first flights, in an early form of hang-glider.

=== Undated ===
- Arthur Schaef makes short powered hops in his first aircraft, the New Zealand Vogel, at Lyall Bay, Wellington.

== Arts and literature ==
See 1911 in art, 1911 in literature

=== Music ===
See: 1911 in music

=== Film ===
See: Category:1911 film awards, 1911 in film, List of New Zealand feature films, Cinema of New Zealand, Category:1911 films

== Sport ==
- See: 1911 in sports, Category:1911 in sports

=== Athletics ===
- Three New Zealanders, Guy Haskins, Ron Opie and William A. Woodger, compete in the Festival of Empire meeting in London, a forerunner of the Empire (now Commonwealth) Games.

=== Chess ===
- The 24th National Chess Championship was held in Timaru, and was won by W.E. Mason of Wellington, his third title.

=== Golf ===
==== Men's ====
- The fifth New Zealand Open championship was held in Wanganui and was won by amateur Arthur Duncan, his third win.
- The 19th National Amateur Championships were held in Wanganui
  - Men: Arthur Duncan (Wellington) – 7th title

==== Women's ====
- Matchplay: Miss ? Brandon.
- Strokeplay (1st championship): Mrs G. Williams

=== Horse racing ===
==== Harness racing ====
- New Zealand Trotting Cup: Lady Clare
- Auckland Trotting Cup: Bingana

=== Rugby league ===
- New Zealand national rugby league team

=== Rugby union ===
- Auckland defend the Ranfurly Shield against South Auckland (21–5) and Poverty Bay (29–10)

=== Shooting ===
- Ballinger Belt – Douglas Roots (Kaponga)

=== Soccer ===
A provincial league commences in Wanganui
Provincial league champions:

- Auckland: Ponsonby AFC (Auckland)
- Canterbury: Burnham Industrial School
- Otago: Mornington
- Southland: Nightcaps
- Taranaki: Manaia
- Wanganui: Wanganui
- Wellington: Wellington Swifts

=== Tennis ===
- The Davis Cup final is held at Lancaster Park, Christchurch. The Australasian team of Norman Brookes (Aus), Roger Heath (Aus) and Alfred Dunlop (NZ, doubles) beat the United States 4–0, the second reverse singles match not being played.
- Anthony Wilding wins the men's singles at the Wimbledon Championship for the second year in succession.

== Births ==
- 13 January: Joh Bjelke-Petersen, Premier of Queensland (Australia). (d. 2005)
- 24 January: Alfred Hulme, Victoria Cross winner. (d. 1982)
- 17 February: Saul Goldsmith, political candidate. (d. 1988)
- 28 February: J. A. W. Bennett, literary scholar. (d. 1981)
- 1 March: Mike Gilbert, rugby union player (d. 2002)
- 30 March: David Russell, George Cross winner. (d. 1945)
- 13 April: Jim Clayton, rower. (d. 1992)
- 2 May: Ina Pickering, cricketer.(d. 1994)
- 17 June: Allen Curnow, poet and journalist. (d. 2001)
- 29 September: Harry Lake, politician. (d. 1967)
- 12 December (in England): Joe Bootham, painter. (d. 1986)

== Deaths ==
- 6 March: Mary Anne Barker (Lady Barker), author.
- 2 May: Edward Riddiford, runholder
- 4 May: Rose Whitty, nun and founder of several convents.
- 27 July: Tommy Taylor, politician, prohibitionist.
- 17 September: Henry Burling, centenarian, mail carrier and farmer (born 1807).
- 14 December: Henry Hirst, politician (born 1838).
- Date unknown:
  - Charles Wong Gye, storekeeper, policeman and interpreter
  - Puna Himene Te Rangimarie, healer, nurse and spiritual leader

Category:1911 deaths

== See also ==
- List of years in New Zealand
- Timeline of New Zealand history
- History of New Zealand
- Military history of New Zealand
- Timeline of the New Zealand environment
- Timeline of New Zealand's links with Antarctica
