= 1910 in New Zealand =

- Decades: 1890s; 1900s; 1910s; 1920s; 1930s
- See also: History of New Zealand; List of years in New Zealand; Timeline of New Zealand history

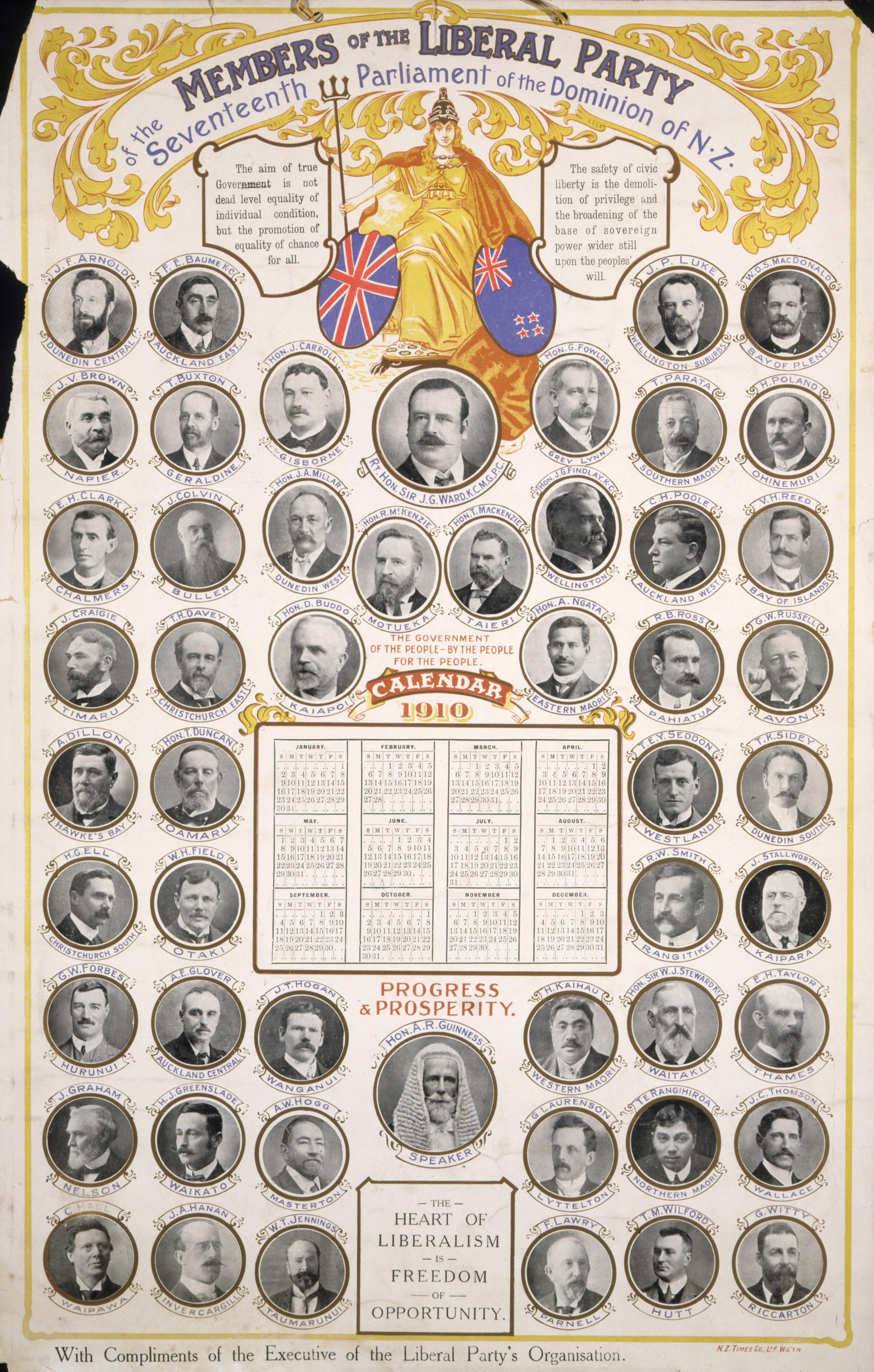
1910 calendar featuring Liberal MPs.

The following lists events that happened during 1910 in New Zealand.

== Incumbents ==
=== Regal and viceregal ===
- Head of State – Edward VII (until 6 May), succeeded by George V
- Governor – The Lord Plunket GCMG KCVO, succeeded the same year by The Lord Islington GCMG GBE DSO PC

=== Government ===
The 17th New Zealand Parliament continued.

- Speaker of the House – TBD
- Prime Minister – TBD
- Minister of Finance – TBD (Labour)
- Chief Justice – Sir Robert Stout

=== Parliamentary opposition ===
Leader of the Opposition – William Massey (Reform Party).

=== Main centre leaders ===
- Mayor of Auckland – Charles Grey then Lemuel Bagnall
- Mayor of Wellington – Thomas Wilford
- Mayor of Christchurch – Charles Allison
- Mayor of Dunedin – James Walker, then Thomas Cole

== Events ==
- February – March: Field Marshal Kitchener tours New Zealand and makes a report to the Government on the defence of New Zealand.
- 5 July: Herbert Pither reportedly makes a flight of "nearly a mile" at Riverton Beach.

Undated

- Aero Club of New Zealand is formed in Auckland.
- Foundation of Eastwoodhill Arboretum at Ngatapa, Gisborne by William Douglas Cook

== Arts and literature ==
See 1910 in art, 1910 in literature

=== Music ===
See: 1910 in music

=== Film ===
See: 1910 in film, List of New Zealand feature films, Cinema of New Zealand

== Sport ==
=== Chess ===
The 23rd National Chess Championship was held in Auckland, and was won by J. Mason of Wellington.

=== Golf ===
- The fourth New Zealand Open championship was held at Christchurch golf club and was won by amateur Arthur Duncan, his second win.
- The 18th National Amateur Championships were held in Christchurch
  - Men: H.B. Lusk (Christchurch)
  - Women: Miss ? Collins.

=== Horse racing ===
==== Harness racing ====
- New Zealand Trotting Cup: Wildwood Junior – 2nd win
- Auckland Trotting Cup: Floranz

=== Rugby league ===
- Great Britain tour of New Zealand – beat New Zealand 52–20 in Auckland

=== Rugby union ===
- Auckland defend the Ranfurly Shield against Hawkes Bay (11–3), Wellington (3–3), Taranaki (16–9) and Canterbury (6–4)

=== Soccer ===
Provincial league champions:

- Auckland: Caledonian Auckland
- Canterbury: Burnham IS
- Otago: Northern Dunedin
- Southland: Nightcaps
- Taranaki: New Plymouth
- Wellington: Ramblers Wellington

=== Tennis ===
- Anthony Wilding won the men's singles at the Wimbledon Championship

== Births ==
- 5 January: Jack Lovelock, athlete
- 10 February: Paul Whitelaw, cricketer
- 15 March: Norman Douglas, politician.
- 27 March: Freda Stark, dancer
- 11 April: Mountford T. "Toss" Woollaston, painter and writer
- 4 July: Peter McIntyre, painter
- 11 August: James Munro Bertram, writer and Rhodes scholar.
- 11 August: Denis 'Sonny' Moloney, cricketer
- 8 October: Gordon Innes, rugby union and rugby league player
- 18 December: Eric Tindill, cricket and rugby union player
- 24 December, William Hayward Pickering, space scientist
- 28 December: Jack Kerr, cricketer
- Full date unknown:
  - Harold Wilfred Youren, lawyer, farmer, farmers’ advocate and peace campaigner (d. 1983)

Category:1910 births

== Deaths ==
- 14 May: Frederick Baume, politician.
- 28 April: Arthur Beauchamp, politician.
- 17 May: Thomas Hocken, collector and bibliographer.
- 1 June: Richard Reeves, politician.
- 16 July: Richard Hobbs, politician.
- 27 November: Richard Oliver, politician

== See also ==
- History of New Zealand
- List of years in New Zealand
- Military history of New Zealand
- Timeline of New Zealand history
- Timeline of New Zealand's links with Antarctica
- Timeline of the New Zealand environment
