= 1907 in New Zealand =

- Decades: 1880s; 1890s; 1900s; 1910s; 1920s
- See also: History of New Zealand; List of years in New Zealand; Timeline of New Zealand history

The following lists events that happened during 1907 in New Zealand.

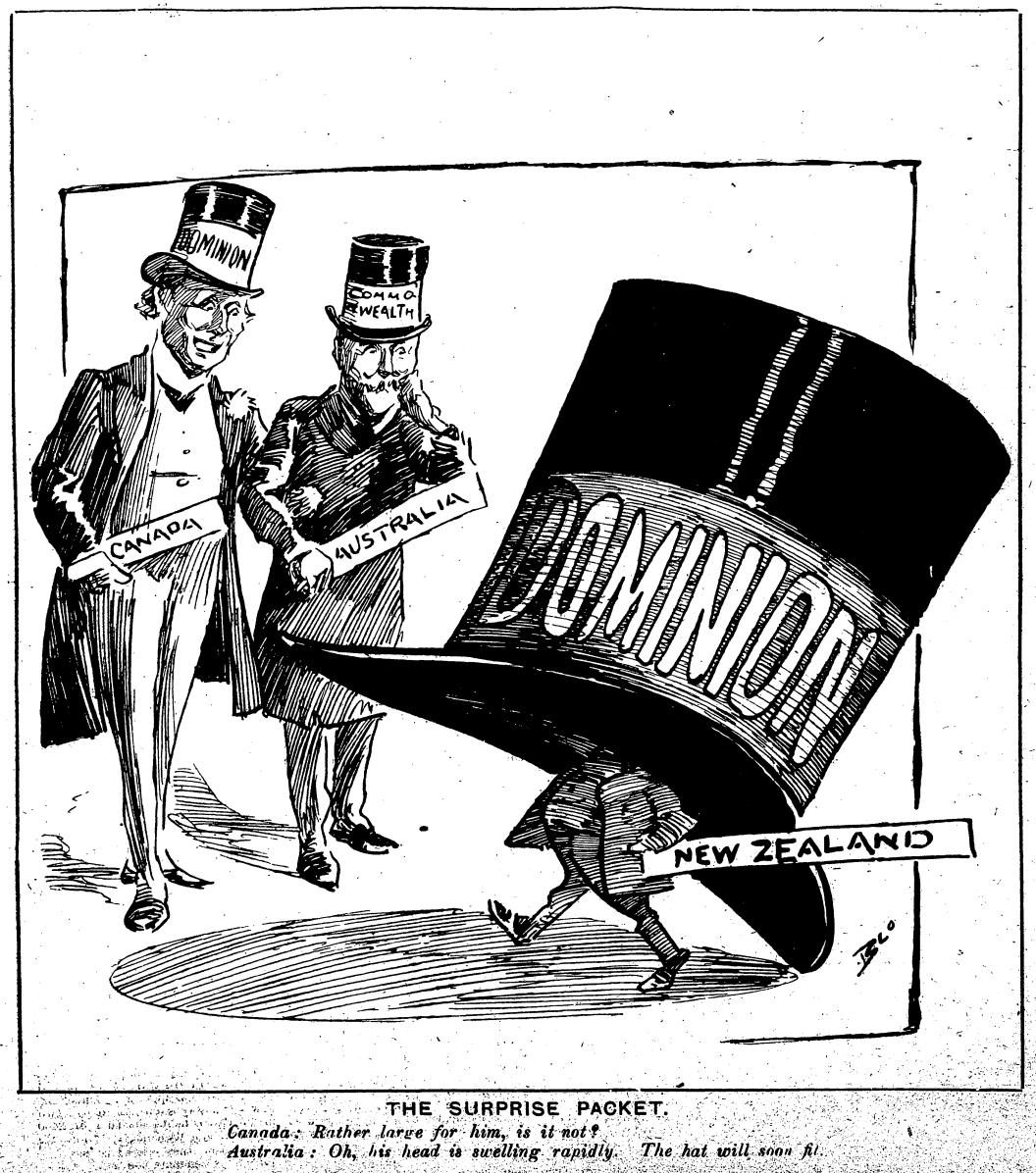
The New Zealand Observer (1907) shows Prime Minister Joseph Ward as a pretentious dwarf beneath a massive 'dominion' top hat. The caption reads: The Surprise Packet: Canada: "Rather large for him, is it not?" Australia: "Oh his head is swelling rapidly. The hat will soon fit."

There are celebrations throughout the country this year as New Zealand changes from colony to independent dominion status by proclamation of Edward VII on 26 September. In Wellington on 11 December there is a great sensation when the tinder-dry Parliament buildings burn to the ground.

== Incumbents ==
=== Regal and viceregal ===
- Head of State – Edward VII
- Governor – The Lord Plunket GCMG KCVO

=== Government ===
The 16th New Zealand Parliament

- Speaker of the House – Sir Arthur Guinness
- Prime Minister – Joseph Ward
- Minister of Finance – Joseph Ward
- Attorney-General – John Findlay
- Chief Justice – Sir Robert Stout

=== Parliamentary opposition ===
- Leader of the Opposition – William Massey, (Independent).

=== Main centre leaders ===
- Mayor of Auckland – Arthur Myers
- Mayor of Wellington – Thomas Hislop
- Mayor of Christchurch – John Hall followed by George Payling
- Mayor of Dunedin – John Loudon

== Dominion ==
With the attaining of Dominion status, the Colonial Treasurer became the Minister of Finance and the Colonial Secretary's Office was renamed the Department of Internal Affairs. The Royal Proclamation of 10 September also designated members of the House of Representatives as "M.P." (Member of Parliament). Previously they were designated "M.H.R." (Member of the House of Representatives).

== Events ==
- The Tohunga Suppression Act is passed by parliament, sponsored by Māui Pōmare.
- Rua Kenana, a self-proclaimed prophet, establishes a religious community at the foot of Maungapōhatu, the sacred Tūhoe mountain in the Ureweras.
- St Paul's Church in Dunedin is consecrated by Bishop Churchill Julius.
- Highest ever recorded flooding along the Taupo, Tongariro, Waipa, and Waikato river systems.
- Prime Minister Joseph Ward is appointed to the Privy Council.
- 24 April - The 1907 Auckland City mayoral election is held.
- 25 April
  - The 1907 Invercargill mayoral election is held.
  - The 1907 Wellington City mayoral election is held.
- 14 May - The 1907 Taranaki by-election is held.
- 24 September - The Tohunga Suppression Act 1907 receives royal assent.
- 28 December - The last officially confirmed huia sighting is made.

== Health ==
- Dr Sir Frederick Truby King establishes the Royal New Zealand Society for the Health of Women and Children which later becomes The Royal New Zealand Plunket Society, known simply as Plunket. The society established Plunket Rooms throughout the country and provides specially trained nurses to advise and assist New Zealand mothers free of charge.
- The first Home of Compassion is opened, at Island Bay in Wellington, by Mother Suzanne Aubert who had founded the congregation of the Sisters of Compassion in Jerusalem on the Whanganui River in 1892.
- The country's first dental school opens at Otago University. The first dean is Sir Henry Percy Pickerill, a pioneer of reconstructive surgery of the jaw and face.

== Arts and literature ==
- The New Zealand School Journal, an education resource distributed to schools throughout New Zealand, is introduced.
- Frances Hodgkins holds her first solo exhibition, in London.
- Publishing firm A.H. & A.W. Reed is established in Dunedin.
- The House of Royal Doulton produces Kia Ora, a ceramic series of New Zealand themes, which become a collector's item.

== The sciences ==
- Thames astronomer John Grigg discovers his third comet, all of which are named after him.
- Pioneer aircraft designer Richard Pearse finally patents details for his wings and aircraft controls.

== Flora and fauna ==
- The now extinct huia bird which was endemic to New Zealand, is last seen in the Tararua Ranges on 28 December.
- Full protection is promulgated for the tūī, kākā, paradise duck and oystercatcher.
- Chamois deer, six does and two bucks from Neuberg in Austria, are introduced to the country and released in the Aoraki / Mount Cook area as a hunting resource.
- This is the peak year in the country's history for milling for export of the rapidly disappearing native kauri.

== Media ==
- 26 September: The first issue of The Dominion newspaper (now The Dominion Post) is published in Wellington to mark the occasion of New Zealand becoming a Dominion.
- After 36 years of publication, the authoritative weekly paper, the New Zealand Mail, closes.

== Transport ==
- December: The Maori II, a triple-screw steamer which is the first purpose-built, inter-island ferry in the country, makes its first run between Lyttelton and Wellington.

== Sport ==
=== Boxing (amateur) ===
National amateur champions

- Heavyweight – J. Lloyd (Christchurch)
- Middleweight – J. Gilmour (Christchurch)
- Lightweight – R. Mayze (Christchurch)
- Featherweight – E. Sanderson (Auckland)
- Bantamweight – B. Tracy (Wellington)

=== Cricket ===
- Inaugural year of Plunket Shield, won by Canterbury.
- The MCC tour the country, losing to New Zealand at the Basin Reserve, but winning at Lancaster Park.

=== Chess ===
The 20th National Chess Championship was held in Christchurch, and was won by W.S. Viner of Perth (overseas players were allowed until 1934)

=== Golf ===
- The first New Zealand Open championship is held at the Napier Golf Club at Waiohiki and is won by amateur Arthur Duncan.
- The 15th National Amateur Championships were held in Napier
  - Men: Arthur Duncan (Wellington) – 5th title
  - Women: Mrs G. Williams

=== Hockey ===
- The Challenge Shield is introduced.

=== Horse racing ===
==== Harness racing ====
- New Zealand Trotting Cup: Marian
- Auckland Trotting Cup: All Night

==== Thoroughbred racing ====
- Apologue becomes the first New Zealand-owned horse to win the Melbourne Cup.
- Auckland Cup – Zimmerman
- Wellington Cup – Achilles
- New Zealand Derby – Elevation

=== Netball ===
- Women's basketball, now called Netball, is introduced to the country by J. C. Jamieson when a demonstration match between Eden and Epsom is played in an Auckland paddock.

=== Shooting ===
The Collins Challenge Shield is introduced by the National Rifle Association.

=== Rowing ===
William Webb of Wanganui defeats Australian Charles Towns on 3 August for the World Professional Sculling Championship, the first world rowing title won by New Zealand.

=== Rugby union ===
- Auckland defend the Ranfurly Shield against Buller (21–0), Hawkes Bay (12–3) and Wanganui(6–5).
- The All Blacks tour Australia, winning both tests. They also play Wellington.
- A record crowd of 52,411 packs the Sydney Cricket Ground for the All Blacks v NSW match.

=== Rugby league ===
- The All Golds New Zealand league team tours Britain, before a match has been played or a club has been formed in New Zealand.

=== Soccer ===
Provincial league champions:

- Auckland: Auckland Corinthians
- Canterbury: Burnham Industrial School, Christchurch Celtic (shared)
- Otago: Northern Dunedin
- Southland: Nightcaps
- Taranaki: New Plymouth
- Wellington: Wellington Swifts

=== Tennis ===
- Anthony Wilding of New Zealand pairs with Australian Norman Brookes, as the Australasian team, to win the Davis Cup.
- Anthony Wilding and Josiah Ritchie win the men's doubles at the Wimbledon Championship.
- Kathleen Nunneley wins the last of her 13 successive national ladies singles titles.

== Births ==
- 29 May: Denis Blundell, future Governor-General.
- 17 July: Jock Barnes, trade unionist.
- 24 August: Thaddeus McCarthy, jurist.
- 18 September Alf Cleverley, Olympic boxer.
- 8 October: Stan Whitehead, politician.
- 9 December: Bernard O'Brien, philosopher and theologian.

== Deaths ==
- 4 February: Tohu Kākahi, Māori leader and prophet at Parihaka (b. c1828).
- 19 March: Peter Seton Hay, civil engineer and surveyor (born 1852 in Scotland)
- 12 April: William Henry Eyes, politician (b. 1819 in England).
- 19 April: Edward Smith, politician (b. 1839 in England).
- 19 May: Lancelot Walker, politician (b. 1829 in England).
- 25 June: John Hall – Premier 1879–81 (b. 1824 in England).
- 10 August: Matilda Meech, shopkeeper and businesswoman.
- 8 October: Maraea Morete, tribal leader and writer (b. 1844).
- 12 November: Allan McLean, runholder and philanthropist (b. 1822 in Scotland).

== See also ==
- History of New Zealand
- List of years in New Zealand
- Military history of New Zealand
- Timeline of New Zealand history
- Timeline of New Zealand's links with Antarctica
- Timeline of the New Zealand environment
