= 1897 City of Dunedin by-election =

New Zealand by-election

1891 Dunedin by-election
- 13 October 1897
- Turnout: 75.59%
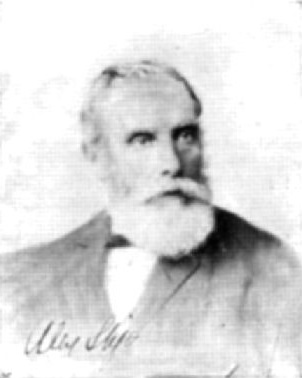

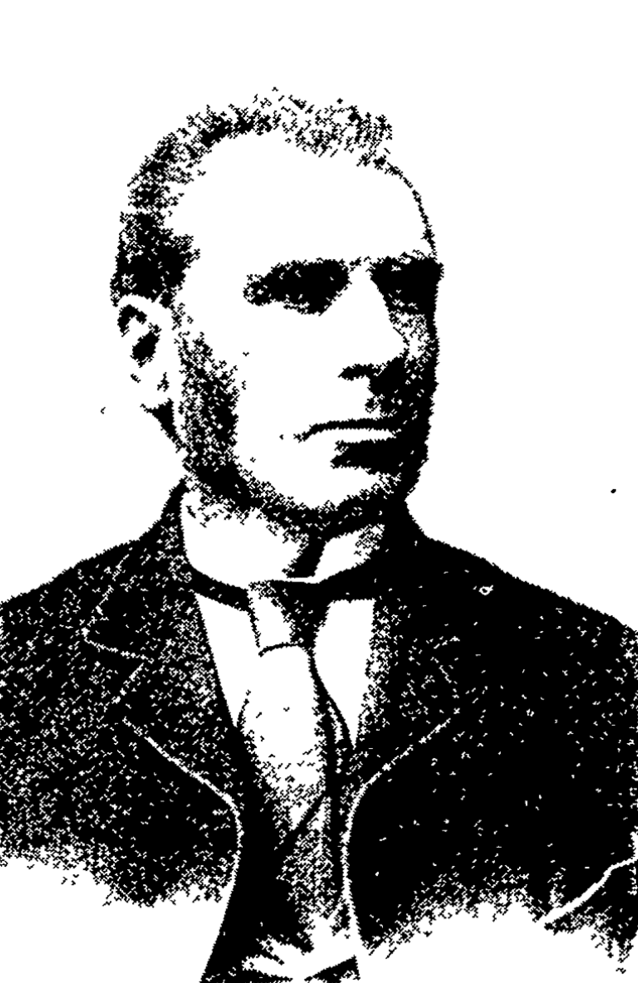

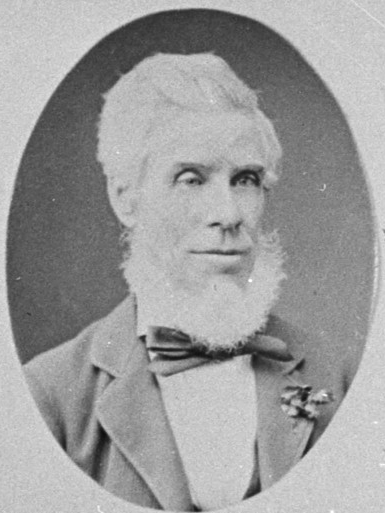
Candidate	Alexander Sligo	Hugh Gourley	William Hutchison
Party	Conservative	Liberal	Independent Liberal
Popular vote	5,045	4,065	2,030
Percentage	45.29	36.49	18.22
Member before election
Henry Fish
Independent
Elected Member
Alexander Sligo
Conservative

The City of Dunedin by-election 1897 was a by-election held in the multi-member City of Dunedin electorate during the 13th New Zealand Parliament, on 13 October 1897.

== Background ==
The by-election was caused by the death of incumbent MP Henry Fish and was won by Alexander Sligo. On nomination day (5 October) Alexander Sligo, Hugh Gourley and William Hutchison were the nominated candidates. Sligo contested the election as the Conservative candidate whilst Gourley and Hutchinson both stood in Liberal interests. Alexander Sligo was subsequently elected the following week.

== Results ==
The following table gives the election results:

1897 City of Dunedin by-election
Party	Candidate	Votes	%	±%
Conservative	Alexander Sligo	5,045	45.29	
Liberal	Hugh Gourley	4,065	36.49	
Independent Liberal	William Hutchison	2,030	18.22	
Informal votes		55		
Majority		980		
Turnout		11,140	75.59	
Registered electors		14,811		
