= William Hutchison (New Zealand politician) =

New Zealand politician and journalist

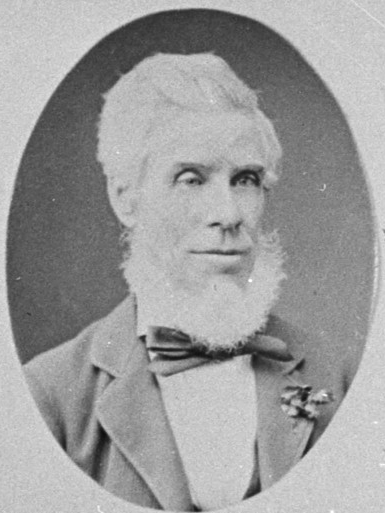
- William Hutchison in 1882

4th Mayor of Wellington
- In office 29 May 1879 – 30 November 1881
- Preceded by: George Allen
- Succeeded by: George Fisher
- In office 15 December 1875 – 19 December 1877
- Preceded by: William Sefton Moorhouse
- Succeeded by: Joe Dransfield

Personal details
- Born: 1820 Banffshire, Scotland
- Died: 3 December 1905 (aged 84–85) Dunedin, New Zealand
- Spouse: Helen Hutchison (m. 1846)
- Relations: George Hutchison (son)
- Children: 8
- Occupation: Journalist

William Hutchison (1820 – 3 December 1905) was a New Zealand politician and journalist. Hutchison and his son George were both Members of Parliament.

== Early life ==
Hutchison was born in Banffshire, Scotland, and trained as a journalist. On 12 August 1846, he married Helen Hutchison (née Aicheson) of Inverness. They emigrated to New Zealand in 1866 for him to take up employment with The Southern Cross.

== Life in New Zealand ==
New Zealand Parliament
Years	Term	Electorate	Party
1879–1881	7th	City of Wellington	Independent
1881–1884	8th	Wellington South	Independent
1890–1893	11th	City of Dunedin	Liberal
1893–1896	12th	City of Dunedin	Liberal

A journalist, Hutchison worked for The Southern Cross in Auckland for some months, then bought the Wanganui Chronicle and started the Tribune in Wellington.

He was Mayor of Wanganui, New Zealand from 1873 to 1874. Then he was Mayor of Wellington from 1876 to 1877, and from 1879 to 1881. As Mayor of Wellington, a central issue was whether the Wellington Waterfront should be controlled by the city council or a separate entity.

He was a member of the Wellington Provincial Council from 1867 to 1876 for the Wanganui electorate.

He stood in the 1875 election in the Hutt electorate and was decisively beaten by the incumbent, William Fitzherbert. He represented the City of Wellington in Parliament from 1879 to 1881, then Wellington South from 1881 to 1884, when he was defeated. He moved to Dunedin in 1884.

He unsuccessfully contested the Bruce electorate in the 1885 by-election, and the Dunedin Central electorate in the 1886 by-election where he was a controversial candidate. He then stood for the Roslyn electorate in the 1887 general election. He then represented the City of Dunedin from 1890 to 1896, when he was defeated. He came fifth in the 1896 election in the three-member Dunedin electorate. Following the death of Henry Fish, he contested the resulting 1897 by-election. Alexander Sligo, Hugh Gourley and Hutchison received 5045, 4065 and 2030 votes, respectively. He was a supporter of the Liberal Party.

His son George Hutchison represented Taranaki electorates in Parliament. For six years (from 1890 to 1896) they were in Parliament at the same time, and were often seen glaring at each other from opposite sides of the house.

Another son, Sir James Hutchison, was editor of the Otago Daily Times.

== Death ==
Hutchison's wife died five years before him. He had been ill for some time before he died on 3 December 1905 at his home in Queen Street, Dunedin. He was survived by four sons and four daughters.

Hutchison Road in Wellington was named in his honour.

== Notes ==
Political offices
Preceded by William Sefton Moorhouse	Mayor of Wellington; 1876–1877 1879–1881	Succeeded by Joseph Dransfield
Preceded by George Allen	Mayor of Wellington; 1876–1877 1879–1881	Succeeded by George Fisher
