= John Barnes (mayor) =

New Zealand mayor

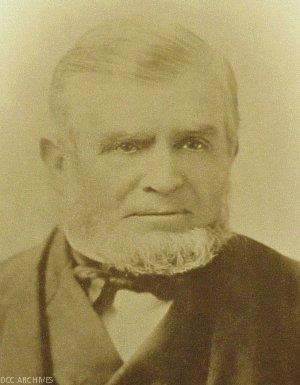

15th Mayor of Dunedin
- In office 1885–1886
- Preceded by: Arthur Scoullar
- Succeeded by: Richard Henry Leary

Personal details
- Born: 24 December 1817; Stockport, Lancashire, England
- Died: 18 November 1889 (aged 71); Dunedin, New Zealand
- Occupation: Carter; contractor

John Barnes (24 December 1817 – 18 November 1889) was a New Zealand local politician. He served as mayor of Dunedin from 1885 to 1886.

== Biography ==
Barnes was born in Stockport in 1817. He emigrated to Port Chalmers aboard the Nourmabal, arriving in May 1858, where he began business as a carter and contractor, ferrying goods to the goldfields, and contracting for public works. He held contracts for the construction of Rattray Street, Stuart Street, Pelichet Bay jetties, and a part of the Port Chalmers railway. Barnes was elected to the Town Board in 1863 and the new Town Council in 1866. Barnes was also appointed inspector of works in 1877, and ultimately mayor in 1885, despite his "crudity of language, hot temper and lack of social graces". He may be the Inspector of Works Barnes who was reported in a "precarious state" after an assault by another contractor, John Thomson, in 1876.

Barnes resigned as councillor twice in order to take a position as inspector of works. In 1886, Barnes's son was supervising a blasting operation in Dowling Street which killed two women in their house. Barnes's close involvement in the works led to questions afterwards.

Barnes died in Dunedin on 18 November 1889, having failed to recover from internal injuries received from a fall from a horse at Milton 18 months earlier. He was buried in the Dunedin Southern Cemetery.

Political offices
Preceded by Arthur Scoullar	Mayor of Dunedin; 1885–1886	Succeeded by Richard Henry Leary
