= Hugh Gourley =

New Zealand politician

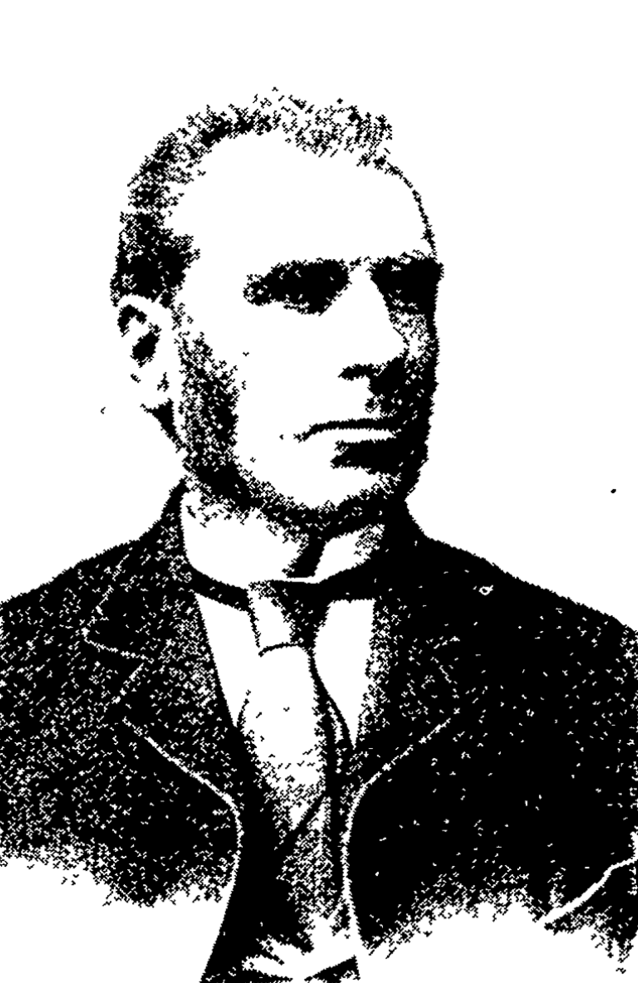
- Hugh Gourley in 1898

17th Mayor of Dunedin
- In office 1888–1889
- In office 1896–1897

Member of the New Zealand Legislative Council
- In office 22 June 1899 – 21 June 1906

Personal details
- Born: 16 November 1825 Ballynahinch, County Down, Ireland
- Died: 16 December 1906 (aged 81) Dunedin, New Zealand
- Spouse: Ellen Gourley (née Johnson) (m. 1850, d. 1874)
- Children: four daughters and four sons
- Profession: Undertaker, politician

Hugh Gourley (1825 – 16 December 1906) was a New Zealand politician born in Ireland. He was Mayor of Dunedin on two occasions and then appointed to the New Zealand Legislative Council for one seven-year term.

== Early life ==
Gourley was born in Ballynahinch, County Down, Ireland in 1825. He married Ellen (née Johnson), a daughter of J. Johnston of County Down in 1850. They had four daughters and four sons. He emigrated to Victoria, Australia, aged 27, where he worked in the gold fields and then in his trade as a saddler.

== Professional life ==
Gourley came to Otago in the early 1860s, initially working in the gold fields before setting up in Dunedin as a saddler. He subsequently engaged in various businesses, including the trades of livery, the operation of coaches to Port Chalmers and as an undertaker.

== Political career ==
Gourley was first elected to the St Kilda Borough Council in 1881, subsequently serving as the borough's mayor for 13 years. He was first elected to the Dunedin City Council in 1885 and became Mayor of Dunedin the first time in 1888 for one year and again in 1896 for another year. Gourley was chairman of the Harbour Board for some time, represented on the Domain Board, and as a member of a range of charitable institutions.

Gourley contested the City of Dunedin electorate in the 1893 election being one of eight candidates who contested three available positions. William Hutchison and David Pinkerton were incumbents who were successful. William Earnshaw was the third successful candidate (he had represented the Peninsula electorate in the previous Parliament). The previous representative, Henry Fish, came fourth, Hugh Gourley was fifth, with other unsuccessful candidates being James Gore, C. Haynes and D. Nicol.

Gourley was appointed to the New Zealand Legislative Council on 22 June 1899. He ceased to be a member on 21 June 1906 at the end of his seven-year term.

== Other interests and death ==
He was active in racing and trotting circles and held many official positions, including that of the Dunedin delegate to the New Zealand Trotting Association.

Ellen Gourley died on 7 August 1874, aged 46. She was buried at Dunedin Southern Cemetery three days later. Gourley died on 16 December 1906 in Dunedin. He was buried at Dunedin Southern Cemetery two days later in the same plot as his wife. One of his sons had died in the Second Boer War.

Gourley's undertaking business was incorporated into Gillions Funeral Services, which is still in operation.

Political offices
Preceded by William Dawson	Mayor of Dunedin; 1888–1889; 1896–1897	Succeeded by John Roberts
Preceded by Nathaniel Wales	Mayor of Dunedin; 1888–1889; 1896–1897	Succeeded by Edward Cargill
