= 1908 in New Zealand =

- Decades: 1880s; 1890s; 1900s; 1910s; 1920s
- See also: History of New Zealand; List of years in New Zealand; Timeline of New Zealand history

The following lists events that happened during 1908 in New Zealand.

== Incumbents ==
=== Regal and viceregal ===
- Head of State – Edward VII
- Governor – The Lord Plunket GCMG KCVO

== Government ==
The 16th New Zealand Parliament concluded but the Liberal Party retained in power following the 1908 General Election in November/December

- Speaker of the House – Sir Arthur Guinness
- Prime Minister – Joseph Ward
- Minister of Finance – Joseph Ward
- Attorney-General – John Findlay
- Chief Justice – Sir Robert Stout

=== Parliamentary opposition ===
- Leader of the Opposition – William Massey, (Independent).

=== Main centre leaders ===
- Mayor of Auckland – Arthur Myers
- Mayor of Wellington – Thomas Hislop
- Mayor of Christchurch – George Payling then Charles Allison
- Mayor of Dunedin – John Loudon then John McDonald

== Events ==
=== April ===
- 8 April – The Invercargill Tragedy occurs, in which James Reid Baxter kills his family and then himself.

=== August ===
- 7 August: First through passenger train on the North Island Main Trunk railway, over temporary track north of Taonui, the 11-car Parliamentary Special carrying the Prime Minister Sir Joseph Ward and other parliamentarians north to see the American Great White Fleet at Auckland (9 to 15 August).

=== November ===
- 6 November: The North Island Main Trunk railway linking Wellington and Auckland is completed, with the last spike driven in by Prime Minister Joseph Ward at Manganui-o-te-Ao and commemorated by the Last Spike Monument.
- 9 November: A two-day NIMT rail passenger service starts, with an overnight stop at Ohakune.

=== December ===
- 2 December: Dunedin Public Library opens, aided by a grant from Andrew Carnegie.
- Late December: Wanganui (population 9000) became the first provincial town to introduce trams

Undated

- Blackball, New Zealand coal miners strike for 11 weeks, an important step in the formation of the New Zealand Labour Party.
- Auckland. Three cultivars of the Feijoa are introduced into New Zealand.

== Arts and literature ==
See 1908 in art, 1908 in literature

=== Books ===
- The first Edmonds Cookery Book is published.

=== Music ===
See: 1908 in music

=== Film ===
See: 1908 in film, Cinema of New Zealand, Category:1908 films

== Sport ==
=== Boxing ===
The welterweight division is included in the national championships for the first time.

National amateur champions

- Heavyweight – M. Ryan (Invercargill)
- Middleweight – J. Smith (Auckland)
- Welterweight – R. Mayze (Christchurch)
- Lightweight – T. Metcalfe (Auckland)
- Featherweight – W. Elliott (Timaru)
- Bantamweight – J. Parker (Christchurch)

=== Billiards ===
The Auckland Sports Club, the national representative to the British Billiards Association, holds the first national championship.

- National Champion: J. Ryan (Auckland)

=== Chess ===
- The 21st National Chess Championship was held in Wellington, and was won by of A.W.O. Davies of Wellington, his second title.

=== Golf ===
- The second New Zealand Open championship was held at Balmacewen golf club and was won by 19-year-old professional J.A. Clements
- The 16th National Amateur Championships were held in Otago
  - Men: H.C. Smith (Otago)
  - Women: Miss ? Christie

=== Horse racing ===
==== Harness racing ====
- New Zealand Trotting Cup: Durbar
- Auckland Trotting Cup: Scotia

==== Thoroughbred racing ====
- Auckland Cup – All Red

=== Olympic Games ===
- New Zealanders compete at the Olympic Games for the first time, as part of the Australasian team. Harry Kerr becomes the first New Zealander to win an Olympic medal.

=== Rugby league ===
- New Zealand national rugby league team tour of Great Britain:
  - lost to Wales, 9–8
  - 1st test: lost to Great Britain 8–5 at Cheltenham
  - 2nd test: beat Great Britain 18–6 at Chelsea
  - 3rd test: beat Great Britain 14–6 at leeds

=== Rugby union ===
- Auckland defend the Ranfurly Shield against Marlborough (32–0), Wellington (24–3), Taranaki (9–0) and Otago (11–5)

=== Soccer ===
Provincial league champions:

- Auckland: Auckland Corinthians
- Canterbury: Christchurch Club
- Otago: Northern Dunedin
- Southland: Murihiku
- Taranaki: Hawera
- Wellington: Diamond Wellington

=== Tennis ===
- Anthony Wilding pairs with Australian Norman Brookes, as the Australasian team, to win the Davis Cup, beating the United States 3–2. The final is held in Melbourne.
- Anthony Wilding, partnered with Norman Brookes, wins the men's doubles at the Wimbledon Championship

== Births ==
- 12 March: Rita Angus, painter.
- 2 June: Lindsay Weir, cricketer.
- 5 June: Les George, rugby player.
- 19 June: Fred Baker, soldier.
- 18 August: Bill Merritt, cricketer.
- 21 September: Charles Upham, double Victoria Cross winner.
- 25 September: Herbert Dudley Purves, medical researcher.
- 26 September: John Pascoe, photographer and mountaineer
- 17 December: Sylvia Ashton-Warner, writer and educator.

== Deaths ==
- April: Charles Rous-Marten, journalist and railway writer (b. 1842 in England)
- 20 May: Albert Henry Baskerville, rugby league pioneer (b. 1883)
- 3 August: Henry Feldwick, politician (b. 1844)
- 2 October: Charles Kidson, art teacher, artist, craftsman and sculptor (b. 1867)
- 8 November: Edward Connolly, politician (b. 1822)

== See also ==
- History of New Zealand
- List of years in New Zealand
- Military history of New Zealand
- Timeline of New Zealand history
- Timeline of New Zealand's links with Antarctica
- Timeline of the New Zealand environment
