= 1912 in New Zealand =

- Decades: 1890s; 1900s; 1910s; 1920s; 1930s
- See also: History of New Zealand; List of years in New Zealand; Timeline of New Zealand history

The following lists events that happened during 1912 in New Zealand.

The 1911 General Election, the first contested by the Reform Party, left parliament in an indeterminate state, with Reform holding 38 seats, Liberal 36, Labour 1 and with 5 independents.

Liberal, who had been in government for the past 21 years, claimed that Reform did not have a mandate, since many of their seats were the smaller rural electorates, and the Liberals proceeded to form a government under Joseph Ward as per the previous two parliaments.

Such were the loyalties of the independent members that votes were often deadlocked and dependent upon the casting vote of the Speaker. As a result, Joseph Ward resigned on 28 March, to be succeeded by agriculture minister Thomas Mackenzie. However, the government was defeated on the next occasion that parliament met, and the first Reform Government was formed under William Massey in July.

== Incumbents ==
=== Regal and viceregal ===
- Head of State - George V
- Governor - The Lord Islington GCMG GBE DSO PC, succeeded the same year by The Earl of Liverpool

=== Government ===
- Speaker of the House - Arthur Guinness - (Liberal)
- Prime Minister - Joseph Ward until 28 March, then Thomas Mackenzie (Liberal) until 10 July, then William Massey (Reform)
- Minister of Finance - Joseph Ward until 28 March, then Arthur Myers (Liberal) until 10 July, then James Allen (Reform)
- Chief Justice — Sir Robert Stout

=== Parliamentary opposition ===
Leader of the Opposition - William Massey (Reform Party) until 10 July. The Liberal opposition had no recognised leader until the following year.

=== Main centre leaders ===
- Mayor of Auckland - James Parr
- Mayor of Wellington - David McLaren
- Mayor of Christchurch - John Joseph Dougall then Henry Holland
- Mayor of Dunedin - William Burnett then John Wilson

== Events ==
- 24 February – The TSS Earnslaw launched at Kingston on Lake Wakatipu.
- 28 March – Prime Minister Joseph Ward resigns and is replaced by Thomas Mackenzie.
- April – Pelorus Jack is seen for the last time.
- May – Waihi miners' strike commences.
- 10 July – William Massey sworn in as Prime Minister after the Liberal Party loses a vote of no confidence.
- September–October: French director Gaston Méliès and a company of film-makers make eight films in New Zealand including the first New Zealand feature films; see The River Wanganui.
- October – Waihi Goldmining Company reopens the mine with scab labour.
- 12 October – Three kākāpō are released on Kapiti Island.
- 18 October – The TSS Earnslaw makes her maiden voyage on Lake Wakatipu, from Kingston to Queenstown.
- 12 November – 'Black Tuesday', the peak of confrontation during the Waihi miners' strike. One trade unionist is killed.

=== Undated ===
- The School Medical Service begins in New Zealand.
- Construction of the new Parliament Buildings commences.

== Arts and literature ==
See 1912 in art, 1912 in literature

=== Music ===
See: 1912 in music

=== Film ===
See: The River Wanganui and Méliès' Star Film Company; 1912 in film, List of New Zealand feature films, Cinema of New Zealand, Category:1912 films.

== Sport ==
=== Chess ===
- The 25th National Chess Championship was held in Napier, and was won by W.E. Mason of Wellington, his third title.

=== Golf ===
==== Men's ====
- The sixth New Zealand Open championship was won by J.A. Clements (his third victory).
- The 20th National Amateur Championships were held in Wellington
  - Men: B.B. Wood (Christchurch)

==== Women's ====
- Matchplay: Miss ? Collins - 2nd title
- Strokeplay: Mrs G. Williams - 2nd title

=== Horse racing ===
==== Harness racing ====
- New Zealand Trotting Cup: Albert H.
- Auckland Trotting Cup: Mandarene

=== Olympic Games ===
- New Zealand competed in the Australasian team. Two New Zealanders won Olympic medals, see Swimming, Tennis below.

=== Rugby union ===
- Auckland defended the Ranfurly Shield against Taranaki (6-5), Wellington (12-0) and Otago (5-5)

=== Shooting ===
- Ballinger Belt – Les Loveday (9th Regiment)

=== Soccer ===
Provincial league champions:

- Auckland: Everton Auckland
- Canterbury: Christchurch Nomads
- Otago: Mornington Dunedin
- Southland: Nightcaps
- Taranaki: Kaponga
- Wanganui: Eastbrooke
- Wellington: Hospital

=== Swimming ===
- Malcolm Champion was a member of the Australasian team which won the gold medal in the Men's 4 × 200 m Freestyle Relay at the 1912 Summer Olympics in Stockholm.

=== Tennis ===
- The Davis Cup final was held in Melbourne, Australia. The Australasian team of Norman Brookes (Aus), Roger Heath (Aus) and Alfred Dunlop (NZ, doubles) lost to Great Britain, 2-3
- Anthony Wilding won the men's singles at the Wimbledon Championship for a third year in succession.
- Anthony Wilding won the bronze medal in men's singles (indoor) at the 1912 Summer Olympics in Stockholm.

== Births ==
- 1 January: Martyn Finlay, politician.
- 5 March: Jack Marshall, politician.
- 30 March: Jack Cowie, cricketer.
- 3 April: Dorothy Eden, novelist.
- 20 May: Alfred E. Allen, politician.
- 23 May: Connie Soljak (Purdue) trade unionist, anti-abortion campaigner.
- 24 May: Joan Hammond, opera singer.
- 26 May: Eric Halstead, politician.
- 15 June: Oscar Natzka, opera singer.
- 31 July: Harry Ayres (1912–1987), New Zealand guide and mountaineer
- 17 August: Elsie Locke, left-wing activist.
- 30 August: Nancy Wake, resistance fighter.
- 20 September: Richard Wild, 9th Chief Justice of New Zealand.
- 15 October: George Laking, diplomat.
- 4 November: Henry Gifford 'Giff' Vivian, cricketer.
- 9 December: Denis Glover, poet and publisher.
- Rosemary Firth, ethnologist.

== Deaths ==
- 5 February: Henry Samuel Fitzherbert, lawyer and politician.
- 7 April Isaac Wilson, politician and businessman.
- 7 May James McGowan, politician.
- 18 May William Lee Rees, politician.
- 8 July William Gilbert Mair, soldier and judge
- 27 September: Robert Houston, politician.
- 10 October: James Mackay, farmer and politician.
- 30 October: William Steward, politician
- 9 November: Mahuta Tāwhiao, 3rd Māori King

== See also ==
- List of years in New Zealand
- Timeline of New Zealand history
- History of New Zealand
- Military history of New Zealand
- Timeline of the New Zealand environment
- Timeline of New Zealand's links with Antarctica
