= Meech =

Meech may refer to:

- Meech Lake, Canada
- 4367 Meech, a minor planet
- Meech (surname)
