= Liberal-Labour =

Liberal-Labour may refer to:

- Liberal-Labour (UK)
- Liberal-Labour (Canada)
- Liberal–Labour (New Zealand)
