= John Bryce Thomson =

Mayor of Dunedin

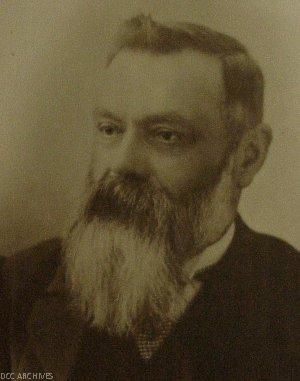
- Born: 1840; Stirlingshire
- Died: August 16, 1911 (aged 70–71)
- Known for: Mayor of Dunedin (1882)

John Bryce Thomson (1840 – 16 August 1911) was Mayor of Dunedin in 1882.

Thomson was born in Stirlingshire in 1840. After completing a carpentry apprenticeship in Glasgow, he emigrated to Dunedin in 1864. Thomson founded the successful construction company McGill & Thomson with James McGill. He was first elected to the City Council in 1876. Thomson was also chairman of the Otago Harbour Board, a member of the Hospital Board, and a trustee of the Benevolent Society. When his partnership with McGill was dissolved in 1893, Thomson continued the business with his elder son. Thomson died in"In" is the correct preposition when referring to death in a city. Dunedin on 16 August, 1911.
