= Alfred Richard Barclay =

New Zealand politician (1859–1912)

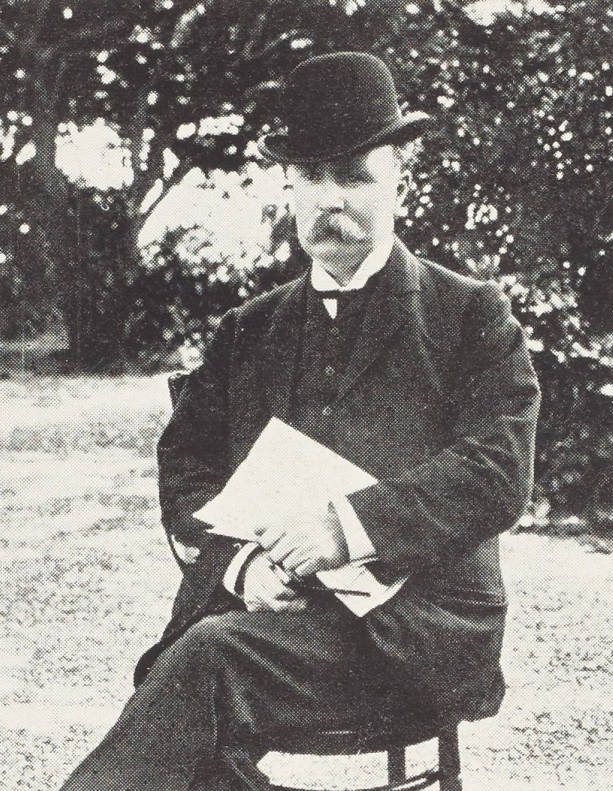
Photograph of Alfred Barclay

Alfred Richard Barclay (8 August 1859 – 10 November 1912) was a New Zealand Member of Parliament for two Dunedin electorates, representing the Liberal Party.

== Early life ==
Barclay was born in Ireland in 1859. He was the eldest son of the Rev. George Barclay and Annie Barclay (née Clifford). The family came to New Zealand in 1865 and arrived on the Dona Anita in Lyttelton, and settled in Timaru. Barclay received his education from the public school in Timaru, from Christ's College in Christchurch, and from the University of Otago in Dunedin. He graduated with a Bachelor of Arts in 1878, with Bachelor of Laws in 1884, and was admitted to the bar in 1887. He practised as a barrister and solicitor for some time, and was appointed lecturer in constitutional history at the University of Otago in 1891.

== Member of Parliament ==
New Zealand Parliament
Years	Term	Electorate	Party
1899–1902	14th	City of Dunedin	Liberal–Labour
1905–1908	16th	Dunedin North	Liberal–Labour

Barclay represented one of the City of Dunedin seats in the New Zealand House of Representatives between 1899 and 1902. He returned to Parliament as the MP for Dunedin North from 1905 to 1908. He was defeated in the elections in both 1902 and 1908.

Barclay was an admirer of Karl Marx: Barclay produced a pamphlet on Marx in 1899, and quoted him in his maiden speech in Parliament. In 1907, Barclay introduced a motion in the debating chamber for the nationalisation of the supply of food and clothing. He was a strong opponent of the Second Boer War.

He was nominated as the Labour Party candidate for Dunedin North in 1911 but withdrew because of illness.

== Family and death ==
On 26 October 1887, he married Annie Baron, the daughter of Henry William Baron of Dunedin. They had three children: George (born 1898), Elfreda (born 1900), and Frederick (born 1904). He died on 10 November 1912 and was survived by his wife.

== Bibliography ==
- Barclay, Alfred (1899), The origin of wealth: being the theory of Karl Marx in simple form / an address delivered by A.R. Barclay at Roslyn, Dunedin, on Tuesday 11th April, 1899, Kensington, Dunedin [N.Z.]: S. Lister, Printer
- Barclay, Alfred (1909), The "Achilles heel" of civilization: being a consideration of the question of unemployment and also Some remarks on the present political situation, Dunedin [N.Z.]: S. Lister, Printer
- Barclay, Alfred (1910), The Premier and his troubles: being an address at the Trades Hall, Dunedin, Dunedin [N.Z.]: S. Lister, Printer

== Notes ==
New Zealand Parliament
New constituency	Member of Parliament for Dunedin North; 1905–1908	Succeeded by George Thomson
