= James Arnold (New Zealand politician) =

New Zealand politician (1859–1929)

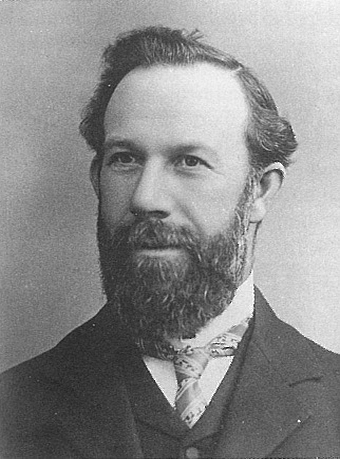
Arnold in c. 1905

James Frederick Arnold (6 June 1859 – 10 July 1929) was a New Zealand Member of Parliament of the Liberal Party for various Dunedin electorates.

== Private life ==
Born in Saint Peter Port, Guernsey, on 6 June 1859, Arnold was the son of Julius Arnold. The family emigrated to New Zealand in 1864. James Arnold went on to become a bootmaker and trade union leader. He was known as "the bootmakers lawyer" at the Industrial Conciliation & Arbitration (ICA) Court.

== Member of Parliament ==
New Zealand Parliament
Years	Term	Electorate	Party
1899–1902	14th	City of Dunedin	Liberal–Labour
1902–1905	15th	City of Dunedin	Liberal–Labour
1905–1908	16th	Dunedin South	Liberal–Labour
1908–1911	17th	Dunedin Central	Liberal–Labour

Arnold represented City of Dunedin (1899–1905), Dunedin South (1905–1908) and Dunedin Central (1908–1911) in the New Zealand House of Representatives.

At the 1905 election, Arnold stressed his Independent credentials and said that the "present administration [i.e. Premier Richard Seddon's Liberal Government] were not all they should be", favoured the elective executive bill, and held himself at liberty to compel the Ministry to reconstruct.

== Death ==
Arnold died at his home in Timaru on 10 July 1929, and was buried at Timaru Cemetery.

== Notes ==
New Zealand Parliament
Preceded by John A. Millar	Member of Parliament for Dunedin Central; 1908–1911	Succeeded by Charles Statham
