= 1865 Dunedin mayoral election =

Mayoral election in New Zealand

The Dunedin mayoral election held on 21 July 1865 was the inaugural mayoral election in Dunedin, New Zealand.

Five candidates stood for election. William Mason was successful, with James Paterson coming second. The other three candidates received much fewer votes than those two candidates. Edward Cargill acted as returning officer. Polling was undertaken in four wards: South, High, Bell, and Leith. A secret ballot based on the first-past-the-post voting system was used in Dunedin, in contrast to Christchurch and Wellington, where mayors were chosen by the city councillors amongst themselves until 1875.

Dunedin mayoral election, 1865
Party	Candidate	Votes	%	±%
Independent	William Mason	495	46.52	
Independent	James Paterson	398	37.41	
Independent	Joseph A. J. Macgregor	88	8.27	
Independent	William W. Wilson	73	6.86	
Independent	Robert H. Forman	10	0.94	
Majority		97	9.12	
Informal votes		46	4.14	
Turnout		1,110	29.52	
Registered electors		3,760		
