= Dunedin South =

Dunedin South electorate boundaries used between the 2008 and 2017 elections

Dunedin South is a former New Zealand parliamentary electorate. It first existed from 1881 to 1890, and subsequently from 1905 to 1946. In 1996, the electorate was re-established for the introduction of MMP, before being abolished in 2020.

== Population centres ==
The previous electoral redistribution was undertaken in 1875 for the 1875–1876 election. In the six years since, New Zealand's European population had increased by 65%. In the 1881 electoral redistribution, the House of Representatives increased the number of European representatives to 91 (up from 84 since the 1875–76 election). The number of Māori electorates was held at four. The House further decided that electorates should not have more than one representative, which led to 35 new electorates being formed, including Dunedin South, and two electorates that had previously been abolished to be recreated. This necessitated a major disruption to existing boundaries.

As the name suggests, the electorate was based on the southern suburbs of Dunedin. It stretched out westwards to take in towns on the Taieri Plains such as Mosgiel, Green Island and Fairfield. The Otago Peninsula was also in the electorate.

The most recent Dunedin South electorate was created in 1996 as one of the original 65 MMP electorates, as a merger between St Kilda and a large part of Dunedin West. Until the 2008 election, it was enlarged at every electoral boundary review, but in the 2013 review, its boundaries were kept. Middlemarch was first included in the electorate for the 2008 election; other localities include:

- Southern Dunedin (48,000)
- Mosgiel (13,000)
- Outram (642)

The electorate was abolished at the 2019/20 electoral redistribution, with the majority of the electorate being included in a recreated Taieri, although the Otago Peninsula was incorporated into the Dunedin electorate.

== History ==
The electorate was first established for the 1881 election and abolished after three parliamentary terms in 1890, when several Dunedin electorates were amalgamated to form the City of Dunedin electorate. During the nine years of its first existence, the electorate was represented by two MPs, Henry Fish (1881–1884 and 1887–1890) and James Gore (1884–1887).

Dunedin South was re-established after the abolition of the City of Dunedin electorate for the 1905 election. The first representative was James Arnold, who was an independent liberal and who served until the end of the parliamentary term in 1908, when he successfully contested Dunedin Central.

Thomas Sidey of the Liberal Party who had since a Caversham by election represented Caversham won the 1908 election for Dunedin South. He represented the electorate for six parliamentary terms until 1928. In 1919, Tom Paul nearly won the seat for Labour, losing by only 84 votes.

Sidey was succeeded by William Taverner of the United Party in the 1928 election. At the next election in 1931, the electorate was won by Fred Jones of the Labour Party. Jones held the electorate until 1946, when it was abolished, and successfully stood in St Kilda that year.

The electorate was re-established for the 1996 election and won by Michael Cullen, who later became Finance minister. Cullen had previously represented St Kilda (1981–1996). At the next election in 1999, Cullen stood as a list candidate only and was succeeded by David Benson-Pope as the electorate MP. After three parliamentary terms, Benson-Pope was not selected by the Labour Party as their candidate, but Clare Curran was chosen instead. Curran has represented the electorate since the 2008 election.

The city of Dunedin is a New Zealand Labour Party stronghold; The last National MP elected from a Dunedin constituency was Richard Walls in 1975. However, in 2011, National Party candidate, Jo Hayes, reduced the incumbent, Clare Curran's majority from 6449 in 2008 to 4175, and National gained a plurality of the party vote in Dunedin South by 1837 votes. The winning of the party vote was unprecedented in Dunedin South, which was seen, pre 2011, as a Labour Party stronghold. However the predecessor seat of St Kilda was represented by Jim Barnes of the National Party between 1951 and 1957. In the 2014 election, Curran was successful against National's Hamish Walker.

In mid April 2020, it was announced that Dunedin South would be reconstituted as the Taieri electorate. The Otago peninsula was transferred to the Dunedin electorate while the new Taieri electorate would include South Dunedin and South Otago, with the latter being transferred from the former Clutha-Southland electorate.

=== Members of Parliament ===
Key Independent Liberal–Labour Liberal United Labour National

Election	Winner
1881 election	Henry Fish
1884 election	James Gore
1887 election	Henry Smith Fish
(Electorate abolished 1890–1905; see City of Dunedin)
1905 election	James Arnold
1908 election	Thomas Sidey
1911 election	Thomas Sidey
1914 election	Thomas Sidey
1919 election	Thomas Sidey
1922 election	Thomas Sidey
1925 election	Thomas Sidey
1928 election	William Taverner
1931 election	Fred Jones
1935 election	Fred Jones
1938 election	Fred Jones
1943 election	Fred Jones
(Electorate abolished 1946–1996; see Central Otago, Mornington, and St Kilda)
1996 election	Michael Cullen
1999 election	David Benson-Pope
2002 election	David Benson-Pope
2005 election	David Benson-Pope
2008 election	Clare Curran
2011 election	Clare Curran
2014 election	Clare Curran
2017 election	Clare Curran
(Electorate abolished in 2020; see Taieri)

=== List MPs ===
Members of Parliament elected from party lists in elections where that person also unsuccessfully contested the Dunedin South electorate. Unless otherwise stated, all MPs' terms began and ended at general elections.

Election	Winner
2014	Jo Hayes^{1}

^{1}Hayes was elected from the party list in January 2014 following the resignation of Katrina Shanks.

== Election results ==
=== 2017 election ===
2017 general election: Dunedin South
Notes:	Blue background denotes the winner of the electorate vote. Pink background denotes a candidate elected from their party list. Yellow background denotes an electorate win by a list member, or other incumbent. A ✓ or ✗ denotes status of any incumbent, win or lose respectively.						
Party	Candidate	Votes	%	±%	Party votes	%	±%
Labour	✓ Clare Curran	21,404	54.11	+5.55	19,183	48.13	+15.00
National	Matt Gregory	12,687	32.08	−6.18	14,164	35.53	−4.17
Green	Shane Gallagher	2,002	5.06	−2.45	2,362	5.92	−6.32
NZ First	Kerry Maria Rushton	1,591	4.02	—	2,625	6.58	−2.49
Opportunities	Lindsay Smith	1,067	2.70	—	967	2.42	—
Legalise Cannabis	Adrian McDermott	332	1.59	—	90	0.23	−0.22
ACT	Daniel Doughty	128	0.32	—	116	0.29	−0.04
Māori Party					83	0.21	−0.04
Conservative					54	0.14	−2.78
Ban 1080					39	0.10	−0.10
United Future					26	0.07	−0.10
Outdoors					20	0.05	—
People's Party					20	0.05	—
Mana Party					6	0.02	—
Internet					5	0.01	—
Democrats					4	0.01	−0.20
Informal votes		343			103		
Total valid votes		39,554			39,867		
Labour hold	Majority	8,717	22.03	+11.73			

=== 2014 election ===
2014 general election: Dunedin South
Notes:	Blue background denotes the winner of the electorate vote. Pink background denotes a candidate elected from their party list. Yellow background denotes an electorate win by a list member, or other incumbent. A ✓ or ✗ denotes status of any incumbent, win or lose respectively.						
Party	Candidate	Votes	%	±%	Party votes	%	±%
Labour	✓ Clare Curran	18,182	48.56	−0.33	12,518	33.13	−1.84
National	Hamish Walker	14,324	38.26	+1.49	15,003	39.70	−0.48
Green	Shane Gallagher	2,813	7.51	−1.77	4,626	12.24	−1.37
Conservative	Cindy Kerr	727	1.94	+1.94	1,104	2.92	+1.44
Legalise Cannabis	Julian Crawford	453	1.21	+1.21	171	0.45	±0.00
Democrats	Warren Voight	234	0.62	−0.07	80	0.21	−0.15
Internet	Andrew Lepine	177	0.47	+0.47			
ACT	Colin Nicholls	143	0.38	−0.24	125	0.33	−0.27
NZ First					3,429	9.07	+1.92
Internet Mana					307	0.81	+0.63 (Note: 2014 Internet Mana swing is relative to the votes for Mana in 2011; it shared a party list with Internet in the 2014 election.)
Māori Party					95	0.25	−0.05
Ban 1080					77	0.20	+0.20
United Future					63	0.17	−0.36
Civilian					18	0.05	+0.05
Focus					7	0.02	+0.02
Independent Coalition					5	0.01	+0.01
Informal votes		389			161		
Total valid votes		37,442			37,789		
Turnout		37,831	81.60	+4.60			
Labour hold	Majority	3,858	10.30	−1.82			

=== 2011 election ===
2011 general election: Dunedin South
Notes:	Blue background denotes the winner of the electorate vote. Pink background denotes a candidate elected from their party list. Yellow background denotes an electorate win by a list member, or other incumbent. A ✓ or ✗ denotes status of any incumbent, win or lose respectively.						
Party	Candidate	Votes	%	±%	Party votes	%	±%
Labour	✓ Clare Curran	16,844	48.89	-3.40	12,326	34.97	-11.76
National	Jo Hayes	12,669	36.77	+2.05	14,163	40.18	+5.97
Green	Shane Gallagher	3,197	9.28	+2.44	4,798	13.61	+5.64
NZ First	Randall Ratana	979	2.84	+2.84	2,522	7.15	+2.59
Democrats	Warren Voight	238	0.69	+0.22	126	0.36	+0.18
ACT	Kimberly Hannah	215	0.62	-0.81	210	0.60	-1.51
Restore All Things in Christ	Robert Wansink	167	0.48	+0.18			
Alliance	Kay Murray	142	0.41	-0.13	58	0.16	-0.03
Conservative					520	1.48	+1.48
United Future					186	0.53	-0.21
Legalise Cannabis					157	0.45	+0.06
Māori Party					107	0.30	-0.13
Mana					62	0.18	+0.18
Libertarianz					16	0.05	+0.01
Informal votes		830			318		
Total valid votes		34,451			35,569		
Labour hold	Majority	4,175	12.12	-5.45			

Electorate (as at 26 November 2011): 45,818

=== 2008 election ===
2008 general election: Dunedin South
Notes:	Blue background denotes the winner of the electorate vote. Pink background denotes a candidate elected from their party list. Yellow background denotes an electorate win by a list member, or other incumbent. A ✓ or ✗ denotes status of any incumbent, win or lose respectively.						
Party	Candidate	Votes	%	±%	Party votes	%	±%
Labour	Clare Curran	19,199	52.29	-4.71	17,408	46.73	-10.40
National	Conway Powell	12,750	34.73	+8.00	12,742	34.20	+6.99
Green	Shane Gallagher	2,511	6.84	+0.58	2,971	7.98	+2.57
ACT	Colin Nicholls	528	1.44	+0.79	785	2.11	+1.36
Progressive	J M McAlpine	498	1.36	-0.56	461	1.24	-0.17
United Future	Pauline Moffat	264	0.72	-1.78	276	0.74	-1.73
Kiwi	Philip Wescombe	261	0.71	–	144	0.39	–
Independent	David Bernhardt	222	0.60	–			
Alliance	Kay Murray	199	0.54	+0.00	72	0.19	+0.05
Democrats	Dawn McIntosh	172	0.47	–	66	0.18	+0.09
Restore All Things in Christ	Robert Wansink	113	0.31	+0.05			
NZ First					1,700	4.56	+0.18
Bill and Ben					209	0.56	–
Māori Party					160	0.43	0.21
Legalise Cannabis					144	0.39	+0.13
Family Party					58	0.16	–
Pacific					17	0.05	–
Libertarianz					15	0.04	+0.02
Workers Party					14	0.04	–
RONZ					7	0.02	+0.01
RAM					3	0.01	–
Informal votes		484			183		
Total valid votes		36,717			37,252		
Labour hold	Majority	6,449	17.56	-12.71			

=== 2005 election ===
2005 general election: Dunedin South
Notes:	Blue background denotes the winner of the electorate vote. Pink background denotes a candidate elected from their party list. Yellow background denotes an electorate win by a list member, or other incumbent. A ✓ or ✗ denotes status of any incumbent, win or lose respectively.						
Party	Candidate	Votes	%	±%	Party votes	%	±%
Labour	✓ David Benson-Pope	20,033	57.00		20,348	57.13	
National	Conway Powell	9,393	26.73		9,692	27.21	
Green	Peter Thomlinson	2,200	6.26		1,926	5.41	
NZ First	Alan Heward	1,145	3.26		1,563	4.39	
United Future	Pauline Moffat	795	2.26		879	2.47	
Progressive	Martin Vaughan	672	1.91		500	1.40	
Destiny	Brent Daglish	400	1.14		128	0.36	
ACT	Alan Wilden	228	0.65		266	0.75	
Alliance	Chris Ford	189	0.54		52	0.15	
Restore All Things in Christ	Robert Wansink	91	0.26				
Legalise Cannabis					90	0.25	
Māori Party					77	0.22	
Christian Heritage					35	0.10	
Democrats					30	0.08	
Direct Democracy					8	0.12	
Libertarianz					8	0.02	
One NZ					6	0.02	
99 MP					4	0.01	
Family Rights					4	0.01	
RONZ					3	0.01	
Informal votes		398			127		
Total valid votes		35,146			35,619		
Labour hold	Majority	10,640	30.30				

=== 2002 election ===
2002 general election: Dunedin South
Notes:	Blue background denotes the winner of the electorate vote. Pink background denotes a candidate elected from their party list. Yellow background denotes an electorate win by a list member, or other incumbent. A ✓ or ✗ denotes status of any incumbent, win or lose respectively.						
Party	Candidate	Votes	%	±%	Party votes	%	±%
Labour	✓ David Benson-Pope	20,398	63.31	+12.41	18,311	55.89	+5.37
National	Paul Foster-Bell	5,674	17.61		5,004	15.27	-7.50
Green	Fliss Butcher	2,023	6.28		2,036	6.21	+2.19
United Future	Jesse O'Brien	1,338	4.15		1,923	5.87	
ACT	Matthew Cain Dwyer	859	2.67		1,144	3.49	+0.06
Progressive	Russell Edwards	750	2.33		765	2.23	
Alliance	Justin Wilson	601	1.87		564	1.72	-9.98
Christian Heritage	Graham Bruce Aldridge	576	1.79		356	1.09	-0.87
NZ First					2,016	6.15	+4.03
ORNZ					415	1.27	
Legalise Cannabis					213	0.65	-0.34
One NZ					9	0.03	
Mana Māori					8	0.02	0.00
NMP					1	0.00	-0.02
Informal votes		521			97		
Total valid votes		32,219			32,765		
Labour hold	Majority	14,724	45.70	+15.81			

=== 1999 election ===
1999 general election: Dunedin South
Notes:	Blue background denotes the winner of the electorate vote. Pink background denotes a candidate elected from their party list. Yellow background denotes an electorate win by a list member, or other incumbent. A ✓ or ✗ denotes status of any incumbent, win or lose respectively.						
Party	Candidate	Votes	%	±%	Party votes	%	±%
Labour	David Benson-Pope	18,065	50.90		18,099	50.52	+10.28
National	Russel Keast	7,457	21.01		8,158	22.77	-3.32
Alliance	Mark Ryan	4,825	13.59		4,192	11.70	-2.36
Green	Sonata McLeod	1,424	4.01		1,440	4.02	
NZ First	Jenny Bloxham	999	2.82		758	2.12	-6.15
South Island	Margaret McCarrigan	912	2.57		413	1.15	
Christian Heritage	John Streekstra	734	2.07		704	1.96	
ACT	Willie Martin	575	1.62		1,228	3.43	+0.89
Independent	Hendrik Kock	497	1.40				
Legalise Cannabis					356	0.99	-0.90
Christian Democrats					178	0.50	
United NZ					149	0.42	-2.24
Libertarianz					48	0.13	+0.12
McGillicuddy Serious					31	0.09	-0.10
Animals First					30	0.08	-0.09
One NZ					13	0.04	
Mana Māori					8	0.02	-0.01
NMP					8	0.02	
Republican					4	0.01	
The People's Choice					4	0.01	
Natural Law					3	0.01	
Mauri Pacific					2	0.01	
Freedom Movement					1	0.00	
Informal votes		697			358		
Total valid votes		35,488			35,827		
Labour hold	Majority	10,608	29.89	+17.77			

=== 1996 election ===
1996 general election: Dunedin South
Notes:	Blue background denotes the winner of the electorate vote. Pink background denotes a candidate elected from their party list. Yellow background denotes an electorate win by a list member, or other incumbent. A ✓ or ✗ denotes status of any incumbent, win or lose respectively.						
Party	Candidate	Votes	%	±%	Party votes	%	±%
Labour	Michael Cullen	12,829	36.37		14,253	40.24	
Alliance	Leah McBey	8,553	24.25		4,979	14.06	
National	Malcolm MacPherson	5,859	16.61		9,241	26.09	
United NZ	Clive Matthewson	5,058	14.34		942	2.66	
NZ First	Noeline McGlynn	1,782	5.05		2,929	8.27	
ACT	Roland Henderson	505	1.43		901	2.54	
Independent	Alan William McDonald	410	1.16				
Progressive Green	David Beatty	215	0.61		107	0.30	
Natural Law	Inga Schader	58	0.16		26	0.07	
Christian Coalition					1,150	3.25	
Legalise Cannabis					668	1.89	
McGillicuddy Serious					69	0.19	
Animals First					60	0.17	
Advance New Zealand					37	0.10	
Green Society					19	0.05	
Superannuitants & Youth					12	0.03	
Mana Māori					9	0.03	
Conservatives					8	0.02	
Ethnic Minority Party					6	0.02	
Libertarianz					4	0.01	
Asia Pacific United					2	0.01	
Te Tawharau					0	0.00	
Informal votes		269			116		
Total valid votes		35,269			35,422		
Labour win new seat	Majority	4,276	12.12				

=== 1943 election ===
1943 general election: Dunedin South
Party	Candidate	Votes	%	±%
Labour	Fred Jones	8,032	58.65	−6.80
National	David Murdoch	4,971	36.30	
Democratic Labour	George Claridge	586	4.27	
Informal votes		104	0.75	+0.25
Majority		3,061	22.35	−9.07
Turnout		13,693	92.14	−1.50
Registered electors		14,861		

=== 1938 election ===
1938 general election: Dunedin South
Party	Candidate	Votes	%	±%
Labour	Fred Jones	8,987	65.45	+1.44
National	Ernest Aderman	4,673	34.03	
Informal votes		69	0.50	+0.12
Majority		4,314	31.42	+3.40
Turnout		13,729	93.36	+1.50
Registered electors		14,705		

=== 1935 election ===
1935 general election: Dunedin South
Party	Candidate	Votes	%	±%
Labour	Fred Jones	7,715	64.01	+6.58
United	Stuart Sidey	4,337	35.98	
Informal votes		46	0.38	+0.14
Majority		3,378	28.02	−3.89
Turnout		12,052	91.86	+3.08
Registered electors		13,119		

=== 1931 election ===
1931 general election: Dunedin South
Party	Candidate	Votes	%	±%
Labour	Fred Jones	6,559	57.43	
United	William Taverner (Note: William Taverner was the official candidate for the United–Reform Coalition)	2,915	25.52	−14.69
Reform	Donald Cameron	1,947	17.05	
Majority		3,644	31.91	
Informal votes		28	0.24	−0.78
Turnout		11,449	88.78	−2.43
Registered electors		12,896		

Table footnotes:

=== 1928 election ===
1928 general election: Dunedin South
Party	Candidate	Votes	%	±%
United	William Taverner	4,462	40.21	
Labour	Robert William Hall	4,429	39.92	
Reform	Charles Todd	2,205	19.87	
Majority		33	0.30	
Informal votes		115	1.03	
Turnout		11,211	91.21	
Registered electors		12,291		
