= Meech (surname) =

Meech is a surname. Notable people with the surname include:

- Athol Meech (1907–1981), Canadian rower
- Daniel Meech (born 1973), New Zealand equestrian
- Derek Meech (born 1984), Canadian ice hockey defenceman and winger
- Ezra Meech (1773–1856), American fur trader and politician
- James Meech (1884–1955), Australian cricketer
- Jeanette DuBois Meech (1835–1911), American evangelist and industrial educator
- Karen Jean Meech (born 1959), American astronomer
- Matilda Meech (c. 1825 – 1907), New Zealand shopkeeper and businesswoman
- Molly Meech (born 1993), New Zealand sailor
- Sam Meech (born 1991), New Zealand sailor
- Thomas Meech (1868–1940), English journalist, author and lawyer
