= James Hamlin Walker =

New Zealand politician

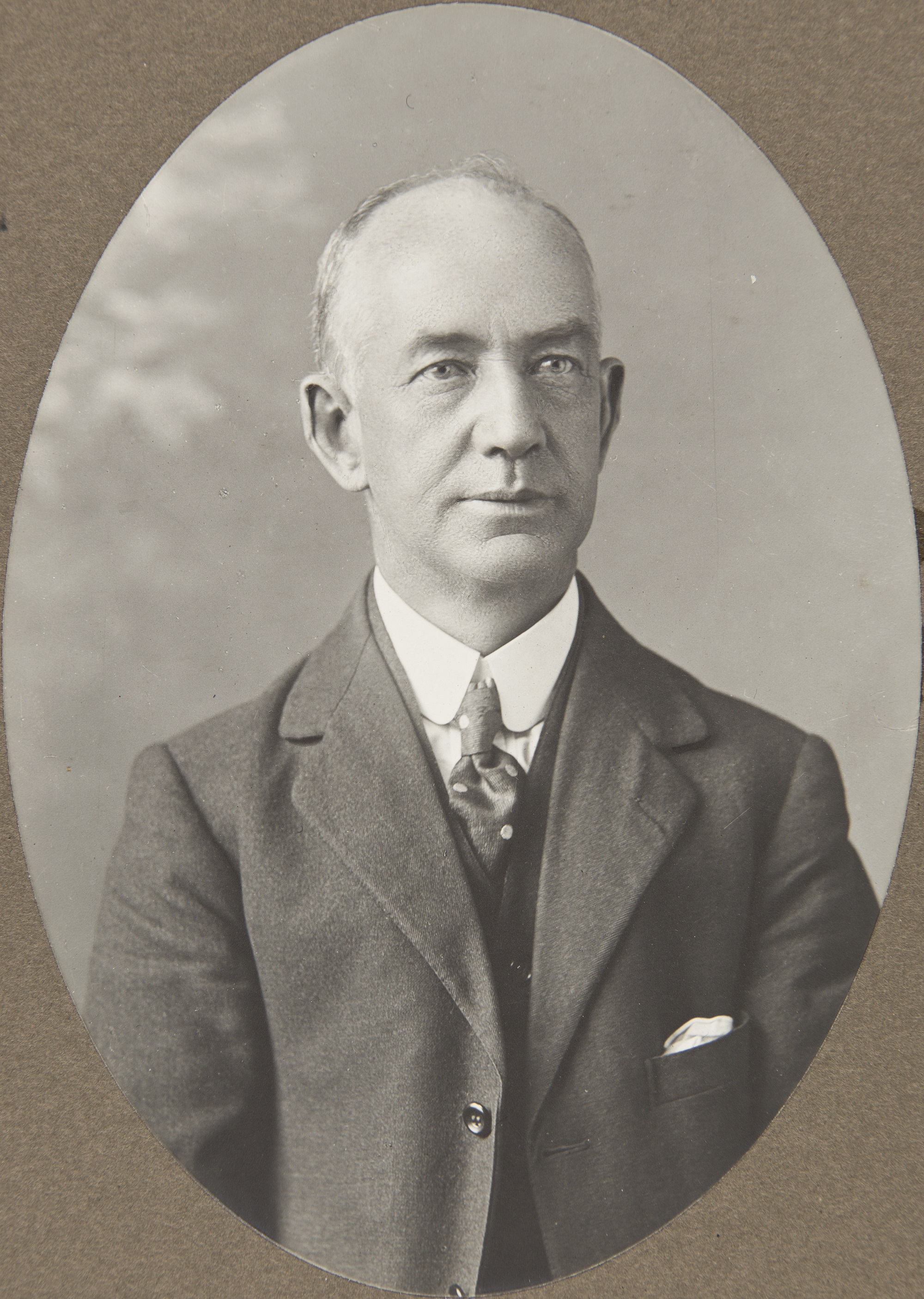
- Walker in 1919

34th Mayor of Dunedin
- In office 5 May 1909 – 4 May 1910
- Preceded by: John McDonald
- Succeeded by: Thomas Cole

Personal details
- Born: James Walker; 12 March 1862 Dunedin, New Zealand
- Died: 16 December 1944 (aged 82) Dunedin, New Zealand
- Spouse: Isabel Blakeley (m. 1892)
- Children: 3
- Occupation: Sharebroker

James Hamlin Walker (12 March 1862 – 16 September 1944) was a New Zealand local body politician, sharebroker, and earlier plumber. He served as mayor of Dunedin from 1909 to 1910.

== Early life and business career ==
James Hamlin Walker was born in Dunedin on 12 March 1862, the son of Thomas Walker and Helen Walker (née Hay). He was educated privately and at Union Street School. On leaving school he joined his brother to form the plumbing firm Walker Brothers. Walker became a sharebroker and land agent in 1913 and was a member of the Dunedin Stock Exchange. He married Isabel Blakeley in 1892.

== Local politics ==
First elected to the Dunedin City Council as representative for the High Ward in 1904, Walker served as Mayor of Dunedin for a single one-year term, from 1909 to 1910. His period of office included the initiation of an amalgamation between Dunedin City and North East Valley Borough. He also submitted a proposal for amalgamation with the Dunedin Drainage Board and was instrumental in setting up a committee for the review of by-laws. He did not stand for re-election.

Walker was the first Chairman of the Otago Hospital and Charitable Aid Board, a position he held for eight years. He led a campaign for the extension of the hospital system in the province, particular with regard to sanitoria. He served as Chairman of the Otago Harbour Board and was a member of the University of Otago Council for eleven years. He was a member of the High Street School Committee for ten years and chairman for three. After World War I he was chairman of the committee which raised funds to build premises for the Dunedin Returned Services' Association.

== Other activities ==
Strongly interested in music, for thirty years Walker was closely associated with brass bands. He was a Vice President of the New Zealand Bands Association. Over a similar length of time he was closely associated with the Dunedin Competitions Society, his various roles including chairman, treasurer, and committee member. He was also involved with musical arrangements for the New Zealand and South Seas International Exhibition of 1925-1926. As a trustee and chairman of the Mammoth Art Union Committee, Walker helped oversee the distribution of funds for the improvement of Logan Park.

Walker was associated with St Andrew's Presbyterian Church and served as a deacon for many years. He was also a justice of the peace. A keen bowler, he was a member of the Kaituna Bowling Club.

== Death ==
James Hamlin Walker died at his home in Grant Street, Dunedin, on 16 December 1944. He was survived by his wife, a daughter, and four sons.

Political offices
Preceded by John McDonald	Mayor of Dunedin; 1909–1910	Succeeded by Thomas Cole
