= Leo Lemuel White =

New Zealand aerial photographer

Leo Lemuel White (1906–1967) was a New Zealand photographer and aviator, best known for his aerial photography company, Whites Aviation.

Leo White was born in Auckland, New Zealand on 4 July 1906 to May Rae and Albert Edward White, a carter. He went to school in Ellerslie and Remuera and then became a telegraph messenger. He soon took up photography, working at the New Zealand Illustrated Sporting and Dramatic Review, being freelance and later working for the New Zealand Herald. He became known for aerial photography from about 1921 and, in February 1942 joined the Royal New Zealand Air Force as a photographer in New Zealand and the Pacific.

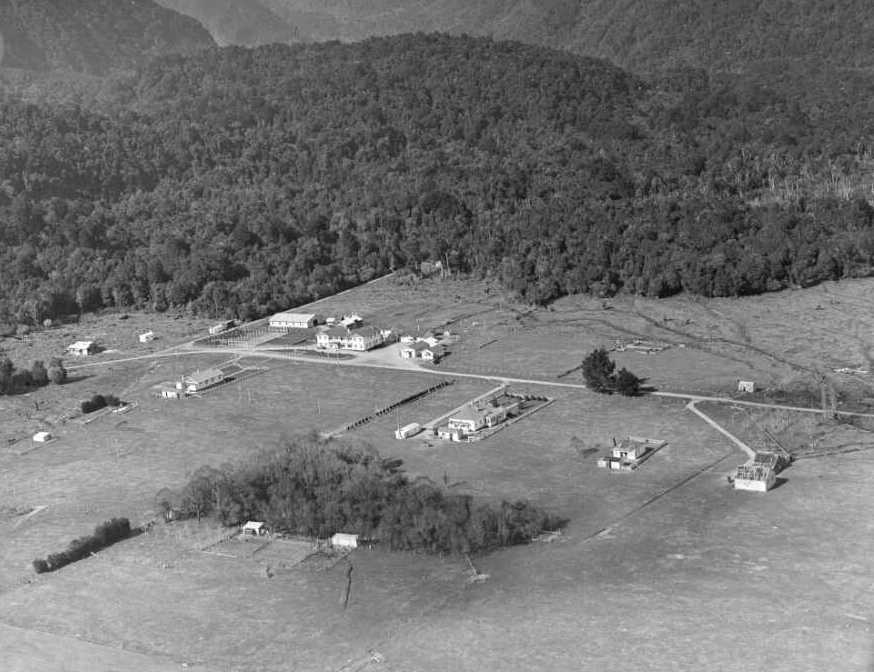
1935 Leo White photo of Weheka

== Whites Aviation ==
In 1945 Whites Aviation Limited was started in Auckland, publishing books and magazines, including several editions of an air directory, and also being a travel agent, from at least 1949 to 1955. During the 1950s Whites Aviation had a team of about 8 artists, who worked on producing popular hand-coloured photographs using oil paints.

In 2007 the Alexander Turnbull Library purchased the Whites Aviation collection—as well as the copyright to the images—and has 79,549 of its items on its website. The building occupied by Whites Aviation remains on the corner of Darby and Elliott Streets, close to Auckland's Queen Street.

== Personal life ==
On 5 June 1934 he married Irene Elizabeth Blakey at the Pitt Street Church, Auckland. Around 1960 he became ill with asthma, emphysema and coronary artery disease. He went to Franz Josef, hoping to ease his condition, but died at Mount Eden on 29 December 1967, survived by his wife and two children.
