= Arthur Scoullar =

Mayor of Dunedin, New Zealand (1830s–1888)

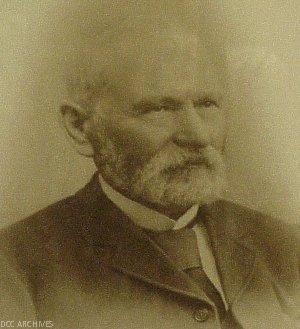
- Arthur Scoullar, Mayor of Dunedin
- Born: 1830s Ayrshire
- Died: June 1899; Wellington
- Organization(s): North and Scoullar, Scoullar & Chisholm
- Office: Mayor of Dunedin
- Children: At least one son

Arthur Scoullar (1830–1899) was the Mayor of Dunedin in 1888.

Scoullar was born in Stewarton, Ayrshire, in January 1830, the son of Joseph Scoullar and Isabel Broadie (Brodie). His father was the miller at Lainshaw Mill, but tragically died in 1831 when Arthur was still an infant. By the age of 7, Arthur had been sent to work, making Kilmarnock bonnets. He later completed a cabinet making apprenticeship, and then in 1854 emigrated to Melbourne. After failing to make his fortune on the Victorian goldfields, he crossed to Otago, where he did well on the Central Otago diggings. Scoullar established himself in business in Dunedin in 1863, founding the firm North and Scoullar, which later developed into Scoullar & Chisholm, furniture warehousemen. In 1882, Scoullar's 17-year-old daughter died of typhoid fever.

Scoullar was elected to the city council, and served a term as Mayor from 1888 to 1889.

A Wellington branch of the firm was opened, and it was in that city that Scoullar died in June 1899, after a brief illness. He was survived by his wife and at least one son.
