= Bill Pratney =

New Zealand cyclist (1909–2001)

William Pratney (born Wiremu Paratene, 20 May 1909 – 25 August 2001) was a New Zealand professional cyclist and politician. He won New Zealand championship titles on track and on road.

Born in 1909, Pratney was originally named Wiremu Paratene. His mother died giving birth to him and he was initially raised by his grandmother who also died a few years later. He was then raised in an orphanage and named William Pratney. As a teenager he won local running and cycling races and decided to concentrate on cycling. However, in 1930 he was involved in a head-on bicycle crash with other racing cyclists and, after being in a coma for three days, doctors predicted he would never cycle again.

Three months after the accident he was back on his bike and in 1934 he won fastest time in the 120 mile Taranaki Round-the-Mountain Race. His road racing career peaked in 1937 when he beat the great Harry Watson in the New Zealand 100-mile Road Championships.

Perhaps the most fascinating thing about Pratney's cycling career was its length. In 1950, he won the Waimate to Christchurch (217 km) and in 1955 he won the Timaru to Christchurch (160 km). He took up racing again in his 70s and his last big ride was a 330 km ride in Australia at the age of 86.

Pratney also served on the Manurewa Borough Council and was an inaugural member of the Manukau City Council.

Pratney married Erlin (Lynne) Pennington in 1943; the couple had two children. He died in Auckland in 2001 and was buried at Purewa Cemetery.
