= Henry Burling =

New Zealand mail carrier and farmer

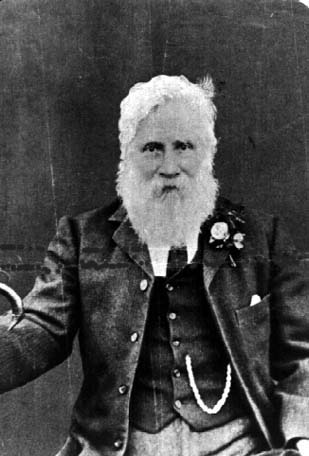
- A photograph of Henry Burling c. 1901
- Born: 5 October 1807; Stratford, Essex (now East London), England, United Kingdom
- Died: 17 September 1911 (aged 103); Waikanae, New Zealand
- Occupations: Mail carrier and farmer

Henry Burling (5 October 1807 – 17 September 1911) was an English-born New Zealand centenarian who was a mail carrier and farmer. He and his family claimed that he was born on 1 May 1801, making him 110 years of age at death, but subsequent research has debunked this.

== Biography ==
He was born in Stratford, Essex (now East London), England, United Kingdom on 5 October 1807 to Thomas Burling, a soap maker, and Joanna Pike. He emigrated to New Zealand on the ship called London with his wife Mary Worsley (whom he had married on 27 January 1839 in Marylebone, Middlesex), arriving on 1 May 1842; one son, Charles, died aged 3 on the journey. He had four children at the time he married his wife and they would have another four. She died in 1864.

Burling worked as a silk and satin printer and gardener and purchased land, before joining the mail service, where he carried mail by foot between Wellington and Wanganui, unarmed, during the New Zealand Wars, usually in what was a physical strenuous activity, where he swam rivers with the mail with the clothes attached to his back. As a result, he earned the trust of Te Rangihaeata and other Māori in the area.

Burling died at his home of Waikanae, after 5 weeks of suffering from bronchitis and a paralytic stroke, survived by three of his thirteen children: Arthur (73), with whom he was living, Henry (86) and Sarah Goodin (69). At the time of his death Burling had over 600 living descendants. At the time he was incorrectly said to have been a supercentenarian, allegedly having lived to 110, although the term was probably not coined then, in his later years he was mentally still alert and strong, but suffering bad eyesight from an earlier accident.
