= James Gore =

New Zealand politician

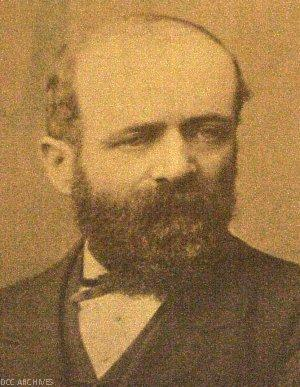

New Zealand Parliament
Years	Term	Electorate	Party
1884–1887	9th	Dunedin South	Independent

James Gore (1834 – 23 July 1917) was a 19th-century Member of Parliament from the Otago region of New Zealand, and Mayor of Dunedin. Gore was born in Liverpool. In 1852 he arrived in Victoria and with his father entered into government contracts for roads and bridges. About 1861 he came to Otago and for some years did similar work and building. He was chairman of the first licensing committee in High ward, a member of the hospital and charitable aid board and of the drainage board. Gore was grandmaster of freemasons (Scottish constitution).

Gore was a builder, and proprietor of a steam joinery in Dunedin. He was involved in construction of many notable edifices including All Saints' Church, Dunedin, the Temperance Hall, the Seacliff Lunatic Asylum

He represented the Dunedin South electorate from 1884 to 1887, when he was defeated.

He was Mayor of Dunedin from 1881 to 1882.

Gore came eighth in the three-member City of Dunedin electorate in the 1896 election.

Gore died in Dunedin on 23 July 1917, and was buried at Dunedin Southern Cemetery.
