= Charles Haynes (mayor) =

Mayor of Dunedin, New Zealand

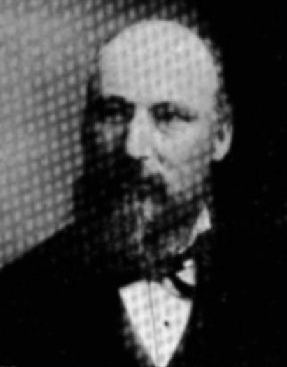
- Charles Haynes, mayor of Dunedin

Mayor of Dunedin
- In office 1892–1893

Personal details
- Born: 1838 Tasmania, Australia
- Died: 7 October 1901 (aged 62–63) Dunedin, New Zealand

Charles Haynes (1838 - 7 October 1901) was a New Zealand local politician who served as Mayor of Dunedin from 1892 to 1893. He was active in municipal government in both Palmerston and Dunedin and held a number of civic and charitable positions during the late nineteenth century.

== Early life and business ==
Haynes was born in Tasmania in 1838 and later moved to Victoria, Australia where he received his schooling. He arrived in Otago, New Zealand in 1859.

In Otago, he initially worked as a carrier supplying goods to the goldfields.

In 1873, he established a general store in Palmerston, which he operated for several years.

== Local government ==
Haynes became involved in local affairs in Palmerston, serving on the borough council and the local school committee. He was elected mayor of Palmerston on five occasions before relocating to Dunedin in 1886.

After moving to Dunedin, Haynes was elected to the Dunedin City Council. He later served as Mayor of Dunedin from 1892 to 1893, having been returned unopposed for the mayoralty for the 1892-93 term according to contemporary newspaper reports.

During his period in public life, he also served on a number of benevolent and charitable boards and participated in community committees within Dunedin.

== Death ==
Haynes died in Dunedin on 7 October 1901, aged 63.
