= Rod McKenzie =

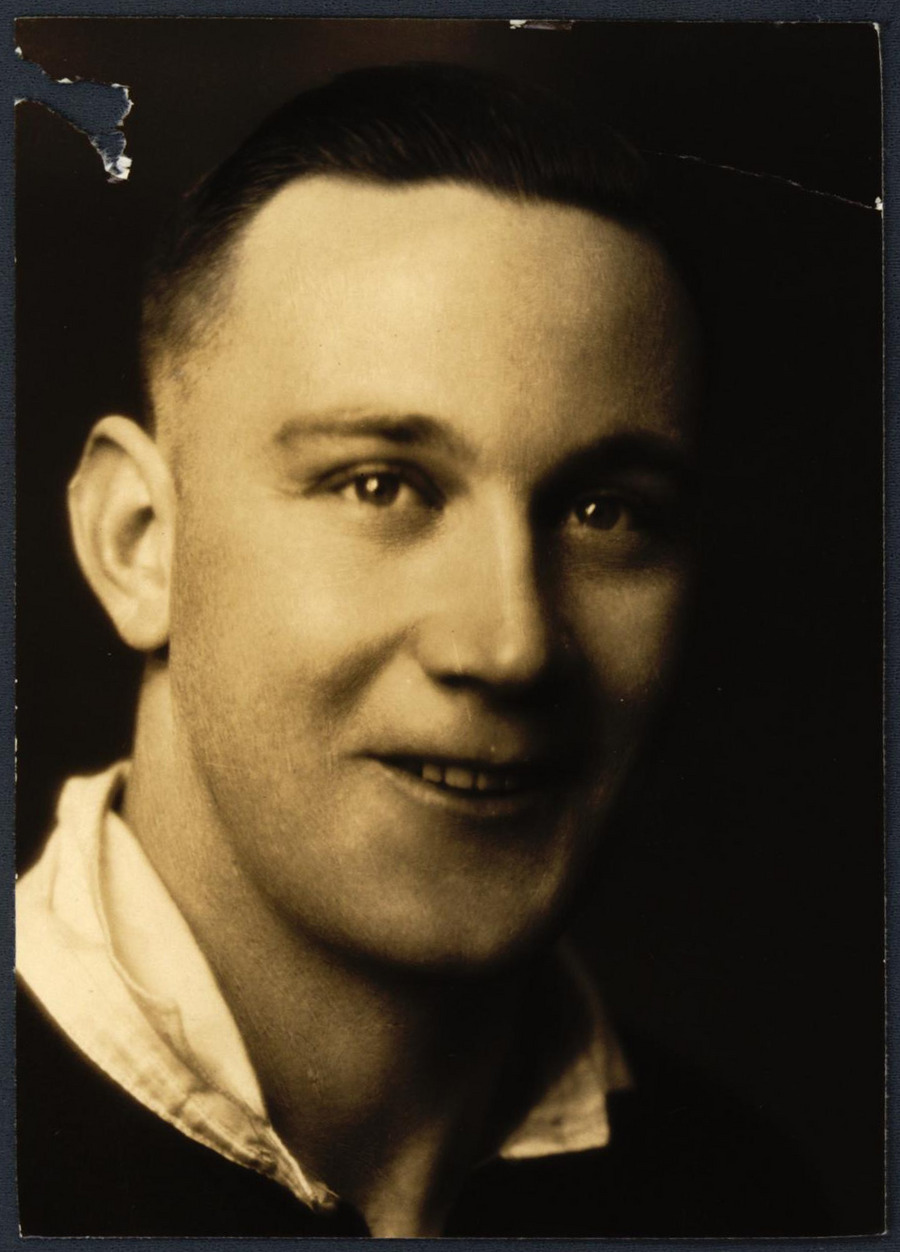
- McKenzie in 1935
- Born: Roderick McCulloch McKenzie; 16 September 1909 Rakaia, New Zealand
- Died: 24 March 2000 (aged 90) Auckland, New Zealand
- Height: 1.83 m (6 ft 0 in)
- Weight: 95 kg (209 lb)
- School: Feilding Convent School

Rugby union career
- Position(s): Flanker, lock
Provincial / State sides
Years	Team	Apps	(Points)
1930–1933	Manawhenua		
1934–1939	Manawatu		
International career
Years	Team	Apps	(Points)
1934–1938	New Zealand	9	(0)
1945	Scotland	2	(0)

Roderick McCulloch McKenzie (16 September 1909 – 24 March 2000) was a New Zealand international rugby union player and a Scotland international rugby union player. He played at flanker and lock.

== Rugby union career ==
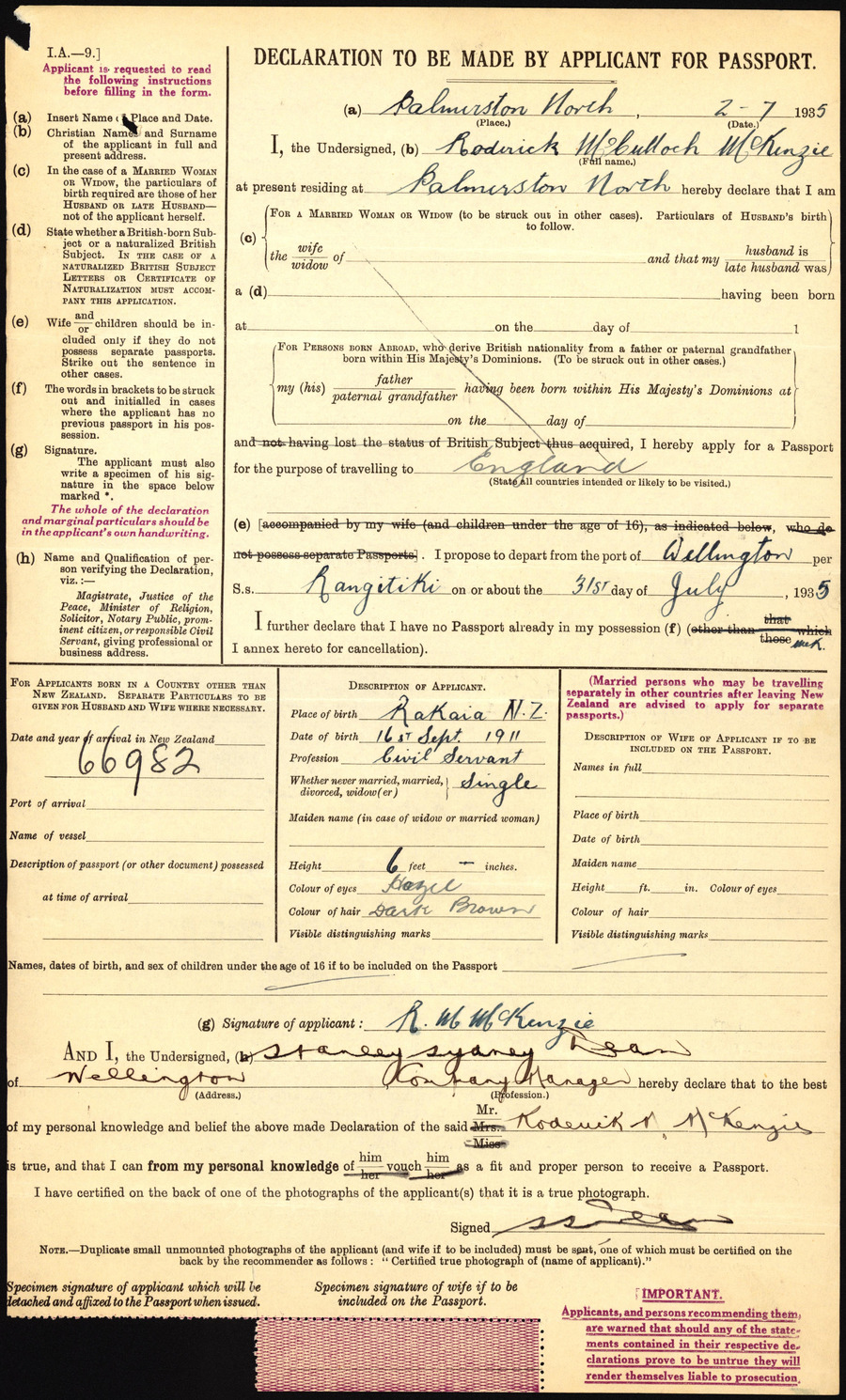
McKenzie's passport application (1935)

=== Provincial career ===
McKenzie represented Manawhenua and Manawatu at a provincial level.

=== International career ===
McKenzie was a member of the New Zealand national side, the All Blacks, from 1934 to 1938. He played 35 matches for the All Blacks—three of which were as captain— including nine internationals.

During World War II, McKenzie served with the New Zealand Tank Brigade, and played in services rugby matches in the United Kingdom for New Zealand Services and Combined Dominions, and twice turned out for Scotland in services internationals.

In September 2023, the SRU finally upgraded those Services and other international players without a cap to be full capped players. McKenzie was given Scotland cap 1161.

== Death ==
McKenzie died in Auckland on 24 March 2000, and was buried at Kelvin Grove Cemetery in Palmerston North.
