= Alexander Sligo =

New Zealand politician

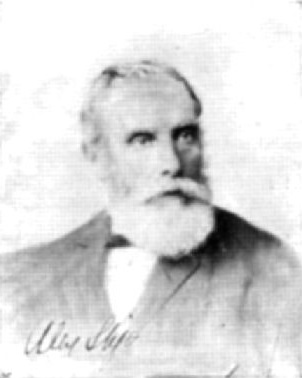
Sligo in 1905.

Alexander Sligo (1832 – 1 December 1909) was a 19th-century New Zealand politician.

== Political career ==
New Zealand Parliament
Years	Term	Electorate	Party
1897–1899	13th	City of Dunedin	Independent

He won one of the three seats for the City of Dunedin multi-member electorate in the 1897 by-election, held after MP Henry Fish died. He was defeated in the 1899 election.

He was a Conservative, opposed to the Liberal government of Richard Seddon.
