= Richard Henry Leary =

Mayor of Dunedin 1886–1887

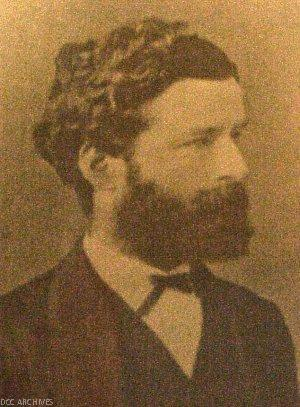
- Richard Henry Leary, Mayor of Dunedin

Mayor of Dunedin
- In office 1877–1878; 1886–1887

Personal details
- Born: 3 November 1840 Southall, London, England
- Died: 14 May 1895 (aged 54) London, England
- Spouse: Carolina Pope (m. 1862)
- Children: 1

Richard Henry Leary (3 November 1840 – 14 May 1895) was Mayor of Dunedin from 1877 to 1878, and again from 1886 to 1887.

== Biography ==
Born in Southall, London on 3 November 1840, Leary emigrated in 1854 to Victoria, where he worked in the timber trade and in the goldfields. In 1861, he left for Dunedin, and spent time in the diggings at Gabriel's Gully, before returning to Dunedin where he became a partner in an auctioneering and accountancy firm, Leary and Grant. He went on to found his own accountancy firm.

In 1862, Leary married Carolina Georgina Pope of Ballarat, Victoria.

During his time as Mayor of Dunedin, Leary investigated the bookkeeping of the gas department, which led to the sacking of the manager, although he was later reinstated. In protest, Leary resigned, but easily won reelection. In 1894 Leary traveled to London to sort of Dunedin loan's, but while there caught pneumonia and died, on 14 May 1895, leaving a widow and one son.
