= David Pinkerton =

New Zealand politician

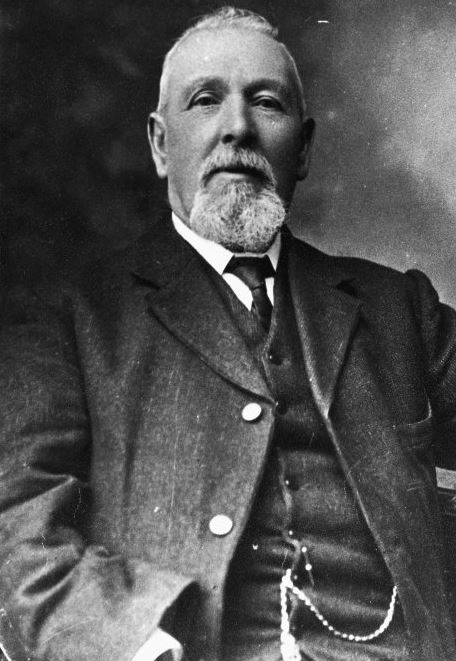

Member of the New Zealand Parliament for City of Dunedin
- In office 5 December 1890 – 4 December 1896

New Zealand Legislative Councillor
- In office 3 February 1897 – 23 June 1906
- Appointed by: Richard Seddon

Personal details
- Born: 26 September 1836 Kirknewton, West Lothian, Scotland
- Died: 23 June 1906 (aged 69) Dunedin, New Zealand
- Party: Liberal
- Spouse: Margaret Fairley

David Pinkerton (26 September 1836 – 23 June 1906) was a New Zealand Member of Parliament for Dunedin City, in the South Island.

== Early life ==
Born in Kirknewton, West Lothian, Scotland. He married Margaret Fairley on 1 December 1857 with whom he had three daughters. Pinkerton came to New Zealand in 1861.

== Political career ==
New Zealand Parliament
Years	Term	Electorate	Party
1890–1893	11th	City of Dunedin	Liberal–Labour
1893–1896	12th	City of Dunedin	Liberal–Labour

Pinkerton represented the City of Dunedin electorate in the House of Representatives from 1890 to 1896, when he came fourth in the three-member electorate.

Pinkerton headed the poll for City of Dunedin in 1890 and 1893. He played a prominent role in Dunedin trade unionism in the late 1880s, was active in the anti-sweating movement, and served as President of the Otago Trades and Labour Council.

Pinkerton was appointed to the Legislative Council after his 1896 defeat, serving from 1897 to 1906, when he died. He was buried at the Dunedin Southern Cemetery.
