= Puna Himene Te Rangimarie =

Puna Himene Te Rangimarie (fl. 1908–1911) was a New Zealand healer, nurse and spiritual leader. Of Māori descent, nothing is known of her early life. She was a spiritual healer who came into conflict with the authorities. Despite intensive lobbying of the native minister, James Carroll, she was prosecuted for her spiritual healing.
