= Charles Wong Gye =

New Zealand storekeeper, policeman and interpreter

Charles Wong Gye (c. 1839–1911) was a New Zealand storekeeper, policeman and interpreter. He was born in Canton, China in about 1839.
