= 1906 Wellington mayoral election =

New Zealand local election

- 25 April 1906
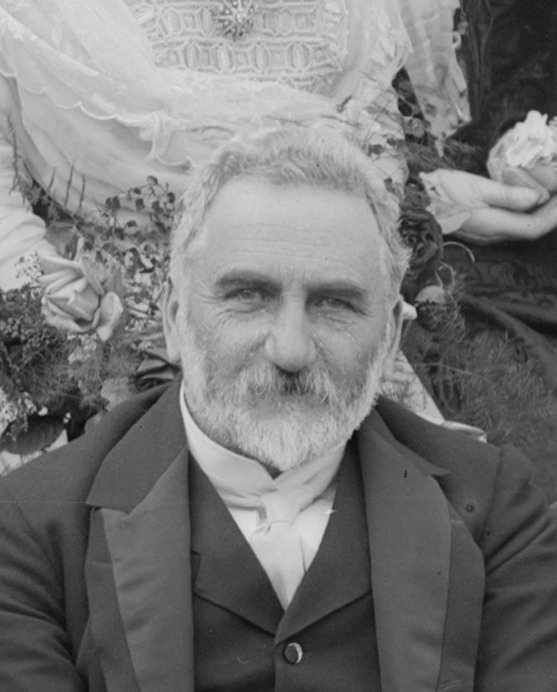
Candidate	Thomas William Hislop
Party	Independent
Popular vote	elected unopposed
Mayor before election
Thomas Hislop
Elected mayor
Thomas Hislop

The 1906 Wellington mayoral election was part of the New Zealand local elections held that same year. In 1906, elections were held for the Mayor of Wellington plus other local government positions. The polling was conducted using the standard first-past-the-post electoral method.

== Background ==
Thomas William Hislop, the incumbent Mayor, sought re-election and retained office unopposed with no other candidates emerging. The mayoral contest coincided with a vacancy on the Wellington City Council following the resignation of councillor Arthur Gibbs triggering a by-election. Nine candidates contested the seat which was ultimately won by ex-councillor John Smith Jr. who had unsuccessfully stood for mayor against Hislop the previous year.

== Council by-election ==
1906 Wellington City Council by-election
Party	Candidate	Votes	%	±%
Independent	John Smith	759	28.18	
Independent	Richard Keene	586	21.76	−7.63
Independent	Martin Luckie	330	12.25	−18.22
Ind. Labour League	John Ball	266	9.87	
Independent	Thomas Wardell	216	8.02	
Independent	William J. Branigan	197	7.31	−15.20
Independent	Alex Rand	140	5.19	−26.14
Independent	Henry Fielder	126	4.67	
Independent	William James Gray	82	3.04	
Majority		173	6.42	
Turnout		2,693	13.30	
