= Jacob William Heberley =

Te Ati Awa carver (1849–1906)

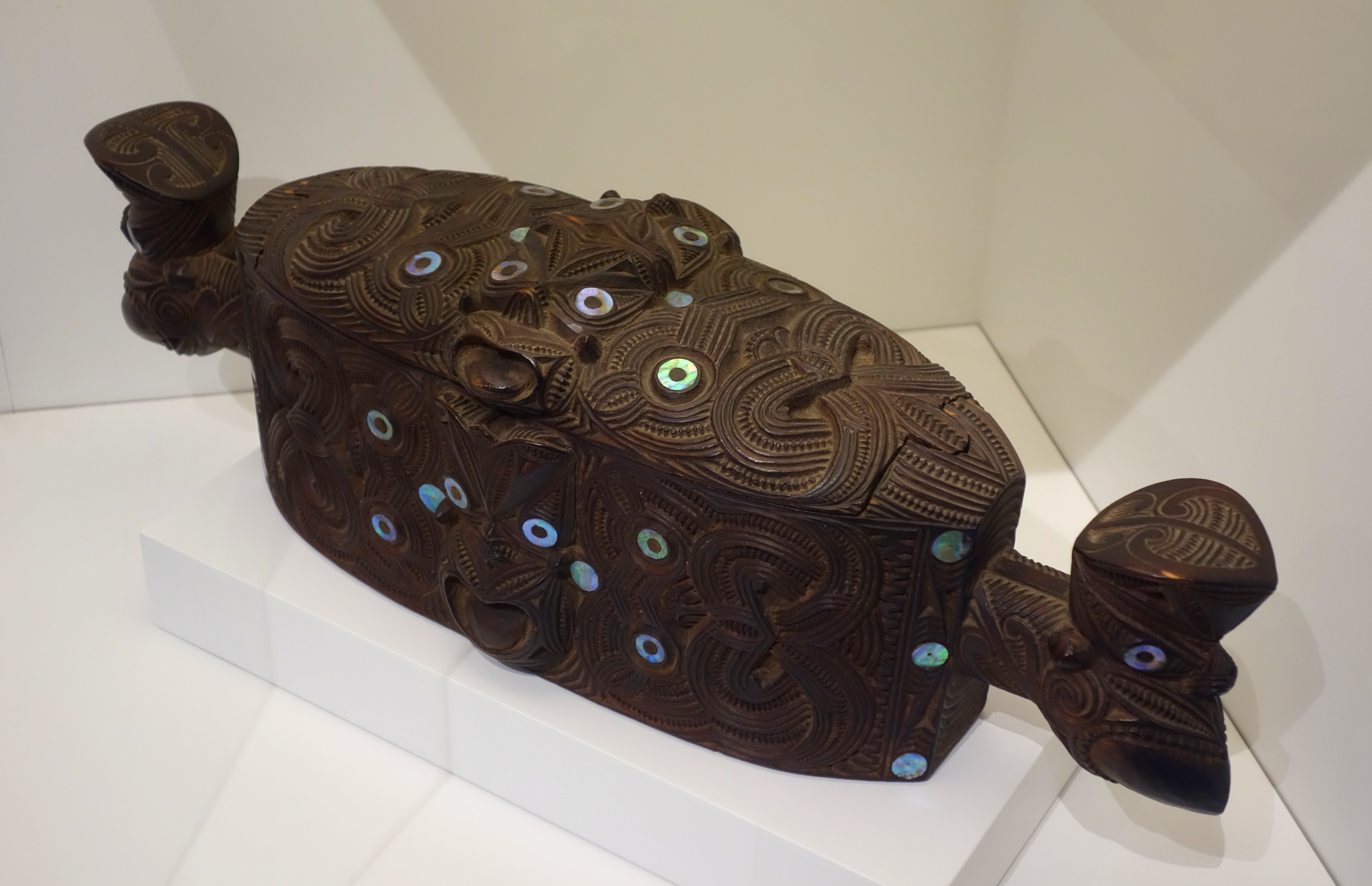
- Waka huia, probably carved by Jacob Heberley, late 1800s
- Born: 11 April 1849; Wellington, New Zealand
- Died: 28 June 1906 (aged 57); Wellington, New Zealand
- Other names: Hākopa Hēperi
- Occupation: Carver
- Years active: 1869–1906
- Spouse: Sarah McLachlan
- Children: 8

Jacob William Heberley (11 April 1849–28 June 1906), also known as Hākopa Hēperi, was a New Zealand carver. Of Māori descent, he identified with the Te Ati Awa iwi. He was born in Wellington, New Zealand on 11 April 1849. Heberley created many small carvings such as storehouses, weapons and model canoes, including a storehouse created for the 1901 tour of George V and Mary of Teck (then the Duke of York and Duchess of Cornwall).

== Biography ==
Heberley was born in 1849 in Wellington, the son of James Heberley an English/German whaler from Devon who came to Queen Charlotte Sound in 1830, and his wife Te Wai (also known as Mata Te Naihi), of Te Ati Awa. Apparently self-taught with no strong links to any carving schools, Heberley likely began carving in the late 1860s while living in Petone. He moved to Greytown, New Zealand in the Wairarapa in 1877, where he met his wife Sarah McLachlan, who he married on 30 August 1977. Together they had eight children, the first three of whom were born in Greytown. In the 1880s, Heberley moved back to Wellington. After his father's death in 1889, Heberley's nephews Thomas and Herbert moved in with his family, and he began teaching them carving.

In the 1900s, Heberley was commissioned by the New Zealand government and private European benefactors to create many Māori carvings, such as bowls, tokotoko (walking sticks), none of which depicted his tribal ancestors or were used to define the identity of the owners of the pieces. Among these pieces were gifts for the Coronation of Edward VII and Alexandra commissioned by the premier of New Zealand Richard Seddon, namely a tokotoko and a carved wooden frame for the coronation address to be stored inside. Several pieces such as model waka and pataka (storehouse) were commissioned for Lord Ranfurly and his wife, as well as the Duke and Duchess of Cornwall and York during their royal tour of 1901 (later styled as King George V and Queen Mary of Teck). Heberley died in 1906, aged 56.

After his passing, his nephews Herbert and Thomas Henry continued to carve in a similar style to their uncle, however Heberley's style never formed a part of a community carving tradition. Thomas Henry Heberley working on projects such restoring the Te Hau-ki-Tūranga meeting house on display in Te Papa in 1936.
