= Harold Wilfred Youren =

- Born: 1910
- Died: 1983 (aged 72–73)
- Occupations: Lawyer, farmer

Harold Wilfred Youren (1910–1983) was a New Zealand lawyer, farmer, farmers’ advocate and peace campaigner. He was born in Auckland in 1910.

== Biography ==
Harold attended Wellington College and later read law at Victoria University College and Auckland University College.
