= Maraea Morete =

Te Aitanga-a-Mahaki woman of mana, writer

Maraea Morete (24 July 1844 – 8 October 1907) was a New Zealand tribal leader and writer. She is the daughter of William and Puihi Morris. Of Māori descent, she identified with the Ngāti Porou and Te Aitanga-a-Māhaki iwi. She was born in Hawke's Bay, New Zealand, either at Whakaari, near Tongoio, or at Waikokopu, near Māhia, on 24 July 1844. She died on 8 October 1907 after suffering severe injuries caused by burns from a fire.

Maraea Morete's book, Life of Maria, the converted half-caste, published in 1887, was listed in Books of Mana as one of the 180 most significant works of Māori-authored non-fiction.
