= 1906 New Zealand Liberal Party leadership election =

- June 1906
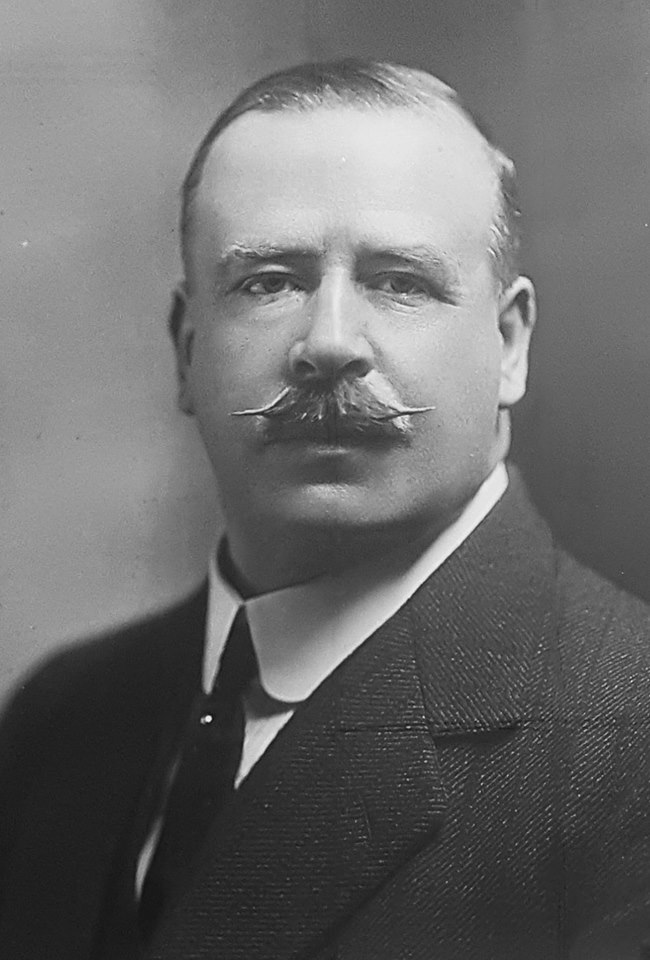
Candidate	Joseph Ward
Popular vote	elected unopposed
Leader before election
William Hall-Jones (acting)
Leader after election
Joseph Ward

The New Zealand Liberal Party leadership election 1906 was held to choose the next leader of the New Zealand Liberal Party. The election was won by Awarua MP and incumbent deputy leader Joseph Ward.

== Background ==
Richard Seddon had assumed the leadership on the death of John Ballance in 1893. As Ballance's deputy there was little opposition to this and Seddon claimed the leadership (and therefore premiership) initially on an interim basis. However, no formal leadership vote was held and Ballance's preferred successor, Robert Stout was never able to contest the leadership officially. Seddon proved to be a popular figure with the masses and continued to lead the Liberal's for a further 13 years until his death.

Seddon died at sea and William Hall-Jones was acting Prime Minister in his absence at the time.

== Candidates ==
=== Joseph Ward ===
Ward had been a Member of Parliament since 1887 and had been a part of the cabinets of both John Ballance and Richard Seddon. Most saw Ward as Seddon's natural heir. Of all the Liberal MPs, he was the most well known to the public a trait necessary for re-election.

=== William Hall-Jones ===
Hall-Jones had been left in an awkward position following Seddon's death. While Seddon was in Australia and Ward was in Britain, he was acting Prime Minister. In the confusion following Seddon's death, he informed the Governor General that he had formed a new ministry, near identical to Seddon's, and would only act as Premier until the Liberal caucus elected a new leader. This did nothing to stop speculation in the press that Hall-Jones might abstain from relinquishing power as Seddon had done before him. Ultimately he did not accept nomination for the leadership.

== Result ==
As Ward was the only officially nominated candidate, Ward was elected unopposed as leader by the caucus. Hall-Jones continued as acting leader and Prime Minister until Ward returned to New Zealand.

== Aftermath ==
Ward would remain the leader of the Liberal Party until he relinquished the role in 1912, following the disappointing result of the 1911 election.
