= John Wilson (New Zealand mayor) =

Mayor of Dunedin (1867–1953)

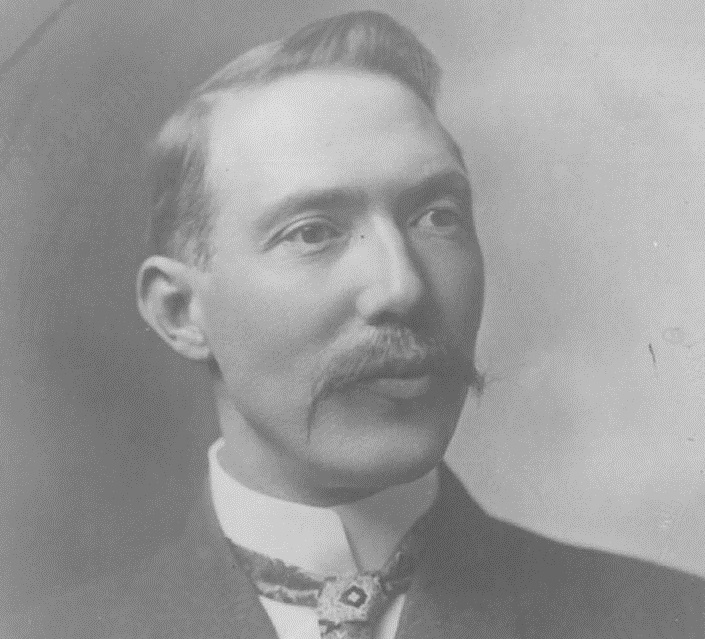
- Wilson in 1904

Mayor of Dunedin
- In office 1912–1913

Personal details
- Born: 3 February 1867 Dunedin, New Zealand
- Died: 15 August 1953 (aged 86) Dunedin, New Zealand
- Occupation: Businessman

John Wilson (3 February 1867 – 15 August 1953) was a New Zealand businessman and local politician who served as the mayor of Dunedin from 1912 to 1913. Born in Dunedin, Wilson established himself in business as a Venetian blind and window furnishing manufacturer and later became a long serving member of local government, holding office in both the former Borough of Caversham and the Dunedin City Council.

== Early life ==
Wilson was born on 3 February 1867 in Dunedin's George Street. His father was William Wilson (1819–1901), who at the time owned the Otago Foundry in Cumberland Street.

== Politics ==
Wilson first entered public life as a member of the Caversham Borough Council to which he was elected in 1896. He later served as Mayor of Caversham for three years prior to the borough's amalgamation with Dunedin City.

Following the merger, Wilson was elected to the Dunedin City Council and serving for extended periods between 1904 and 1933 and again from 1938 to 1944. During his time on the council he was involved in a number of civic bodies including the Dunedin Fire Board and the Ocean Beach Domain Board.

In 1912, Wilson was elected Mayor of Dunedin serving a single term until 1913. His association with the Ocean Beach Domain led to the coastal roadway later being named John Wilson Ocean Drive in recognition of his contribution to the city's civic life.

== Death ==
Wilson died in Dunedin on 15 August 1953 at the age of 86. His last residence was in Grant Street in Central Dunedin. He is buried at Andersons Bay Cemetery.
