= Henry Fish =

New Zealand politician (1838–1897)

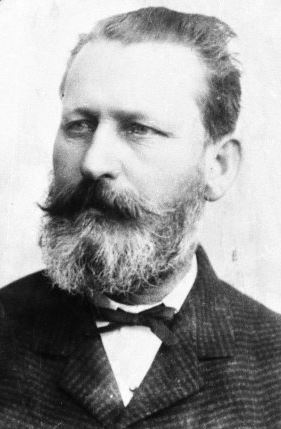
- A portrait of Fish, taken c. 1881.
- Born: 15 July 1838; Pimlico, London
- Died: 23 September 1897 (aged 59); Dunedin, New Zealand
- Opponent: Women's suffrage

Henry Smith Fish (15 July 1838 – 23 September 1897) was a 19th-century New Zealand politician. For a time, he was a member of the Liberal Party. He was Mayor of Dunedin for a total of six years. Smith is remembered as one of the staunch opponents of women's suffrage.

== Early life ==
Fish was born in Pimlico, London, in 1838. His parents were Mary Ann Passmore and Henry Smith Fish, a painter. He received his education at Cave House School and from 1849 at Melbourne, where the family settled. He accompanied his father to the gold diggings in The Ovens, Nova Scotia. Afterwards, he worked in his father's painting and glazier business in Melbourne, and from around 1863, in Dunedin, to where the family relocated. They traded as H. S. Fish and Son and were based in Princes Street South.

On 31 January 1867, he married Jane Carr at Dunedin's St Paul's Church.

== Political career ==
New Zealand Parliament
Years	Term	Electorate	Party
1881–1884	8th	Dunedin South	Independent
1887–1890	10th	Dunedin South	Independent
1890–1893	11th	City of Dunedin	Liberal
1896–1897	11th	City of Dunedin	Independent

Fish was first elected onto Dunedin City Council in 1867. He was the Mayor of Dunedin from 1870 to 1873 and again from 1893 to 1895. In total, he served on Dunedin City Council for over 20 years.

Fish represented the Dunedin electorate on the Otago Provincial Council in 1870, and from 1873 until the abolition of provincial government in 1876. He was briefly a member of the Executive Council in May/June 1875.

He represented the Dunedin South electorate from 1881 to 1884 when he was defeated, then from 1887 to 1890. He then held one of the three seats for the City of Dunedin multi-member electorate from 1890 to 1893 when he was defeated, and from 1896 to 1897, when he died. He was replaced by Alexander Sligo.

Fish represented liquor interests in Parliament, and was an opponent of Women's suffrage in 1890–1893 on their behalf. He paid his anti-suffragist campaigners a bounty for signatures collected, but lost credibility when some signatures were found to be fraudulent.

== Death ==
Smith died of throat cancer in Dunedin on 23 September 1897.

== Notes ==
Political offices
Preceded by Thomas Birch	Mayor of Dunedin; 1870–1873; 1893–1895	Succeeded by Andrew Mercer
Preceded by Charles Haynes	Mayor of Dunedin; 1870–1873; 1893–1895	Succeeded by Nathaniel Wales
