= Matilda Meech =

New Zealand Shopkeeper and businesswoman

Matilda Meech (c. 1825 – 10 August 1907) was a New Zealand shopkeeper and businesswoman.

== Biography ==
She was born in Rochester, Kent, England in c. 1825. She owned and operated the salt-water baths on the foreshore of Oriental Bay in Wellington between 1885 and 1907.

In the year 1891, Meech filed suit against Wellington City Council with the allegation of polluting her baths caused by their destructor plant. Later she successfully earned a victory for the case and have secured £200 as the compensation.

She died in 1907 and is buried at Karori Cemetery.
