= John McDonald (mayor) =

Mayor of Dunedin, New Zealand

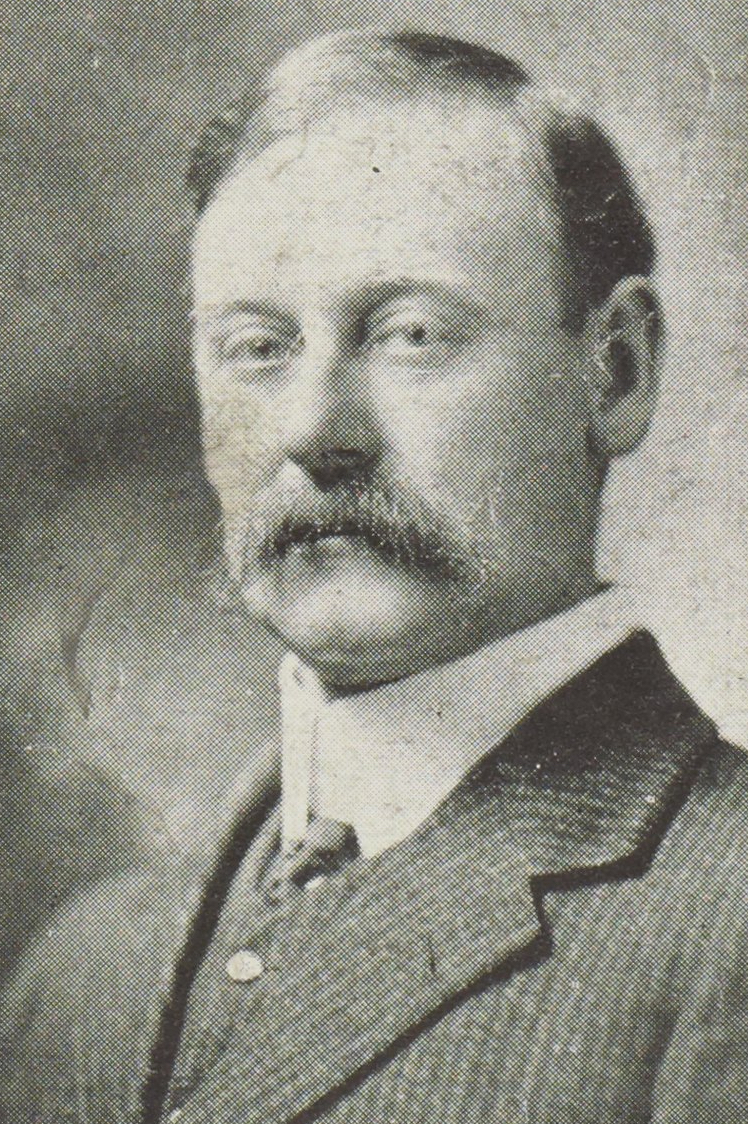
John McDonald

John McDonald (13 September 1865 – 21 March 1945) was a New Zealand politician. He served as mayor of Dunedin from 1908 to 1909, the first New Zealand-born person to hold the office.

== Early life and family ==
Born in Auckland on 13 September 1865, McDonald was the son of Colin and Christina McDonald. He was educated in Masterton and Wellington, before living in Timaru. He moved to Dunedin in the 1890s, where he had a tailoring business, and later worked as a land agent and company promoter.

In January 1909, he married Maggie Cox Lindsay Prictor, at St Stephen's Church, Dunedin. The couple did not have children.

== Politics ==
McDonald was first elected to the Dunedin City Council (DCC) representing the Leith ward, and later represented the High ward. He was elected mayor in 1908, becoming the first person born in New Zealand to hold the post. While mayor he took part in a public demonstration of the country's first radio transmission, sending and receiving messages in Morse code from Andersons Bay to Hagberth Moller at Ravensbourne. He also represented the DCC on the Charitable Aid Board, the boards of governors of the Otago Boys' and Otago Girls' High Schools, and the Otago Hospital Board.

After a break from local politics, McDonald was re-elected to the DCC for a term from 1919 to 1921, and also served on the Otago Harbour Board for six years.

McDonald unsuccessfully stood for the Dunedin Central seat at the 1908 general election and 1911 general elections. At the 1931 general election, he finished third in the Dunedin West electorate as an independent Liberal candidate.

== Other activities ==
Noted for his keen interest in sports, McDonald was a founding member of the Otago Cycling Club, and served as president of the Alhambra Rugby Football Club and the St Clair Surf Lifesaving Club. He was also clerk of scales for the Dunedin Jockey Club and a steward at the Tahuna Park Trotting Club. A long-time member of the Dunedin Caledonian Society, McDonald served a term as its president, as well as a period as president of the Dunedin Piping and Dancing Association. He was also active as a Freemason.

McDonald was chairman of directors of the Regent Picture Theatre Company and the Exchange Court Picture Company.

== Later life and death ==
McDonald died in Dunedin on 21 March 1945, and was buried in the Dunedin Northern Cemetery. His wife, Maggie McDonald, regarded as one of the pioneers of croquet in Otago and who served a term as vice-president of the New Zealand Croquet Council, died in 1950.
