= Arthur Duncan (golfer) =

New Zealand golfer and businessman

Arthur Donald Stuart Duncan (6 August 1875 – 10 March 1951) was a New Zealand golfer and businessman. He was born in Colombo, Ceylon.

Duncan was the dominant amateur golfer in New Zealand in the first part of the 20th century. He won the New Zealand Amateur championship 10 times between 1899 and 1926 and the New Zealand Open three times, the inaugural event in 1907 and again in 1910 and 1911.

Duncan played three first-class cricket matches for Wellington as a batsman between 1894 and 1901.
