= Mayor of Dunedin =

- Te Koromatua o Ōtepoti
- Coat of arms of the City of Dunedin
- Incumbent; Sophie Barker since 17 October 2025
- Dunedin City Council
- Style: His/Her Worship
- Member of: Dunedin City Council
- Seat: Dunedin Town Hall
- Appointer: Electorate of Dunedin
- Term length: Three years, renewable
- Inaugural holder: William Mason
- Formation: 1865
- Deputy: Cherry Lucas
- Salary: $172,378
- Website: Official website

The mayor of Dunedin (Māori: Koromatua o Ōtepoti) is the head of the local government in Dunedin, New Zealand. They preside over the Dunedin City Council. The mayor's role is "to provide leadership to the other elected members of the territorial authority, be a leader in the community and perform civic duties". The mayor is directly elected, using the single transferable vote (STV) system from 2007. The current mayor is Sophie Barker who was elected in 2025.

The mayor has always been elected at large, with the inaugural election in 1865. Up until 1915, the term of mayor was for one year only. From 1915 to 1935, the term was two years. Since the 1935 mayoral election, the term has been three years. The role of deputy mayor was established in 1917.

The mayoralty is subject to election every three years, the next vote being the 2025 Dunedin mayoral election.

== List of mayors of Dunedin ==
Key

Independent Citizens' Association Labour Green Greater Dunedin Team Dunedin

#	Name	Portrait	Term of Office	
1	William Mason		1865	1867
2	John Hyde Harris		1867	1868
3	Thomas Birch		1868	1870
4	Henry Fish		1870	1873
5	Andrew Mercer		1873	1874
6	Keith Ramsay		1874	1875
7	Henry John Walter		1875	1876
8	Charles Reeves		1876	1877
9	Richard Henry Leary		1877	1878
(7)	Henry John Walter		1878	1879
10	Archibald Hilson Ross		1880	1881
11	James Gore		1881	1882
12	John Bryce Thomson		1882	1883
13	William Parker Street		1883	1884
14	Arthur Scoullar		1884	1885
15	John Barnes		1885	1886
(9)	Richard Henry Leary		1886	1887
16	William Dawson		1887	1888
17	Hugh Gourley		1888	1889
18	John Roberts		1889	1890
19	John Carroll		1890	1891
20	Charles Robert Chapman		1891	1892
21	Charles Haynes		1892	1893
(4)	Henry Fish		1893	1895
22	Nathaniel Wales		1895	1896
(17)	Hugh Gourley		1896	1897
23	Edward Cargill		1897	1898
24	William Swan		1898	1899
25	Robert Chisholm		1899	1901
26	George Lyon Denniston		1901	1902
27	James Alexander Park		1902	1903
28	Thomas Scott		1903	1904
29	Thomas Reid Christie		1904	1905
30	Joseph Braithwaite		1905	1906
31	George Lawrence		1906	1907
32	John Loudon		1907	1908
33	John McDonald		1908	1909
34	James Hamlin Walker		1909	1910
35	Thomas Cole		1910	1911
36	William Burnett		1911	1912
37	John Wilson		1912	1913
38	William Downie Stewart Jr		1913	1914
39	John Shacklock		1914	1915
40	James Clark		1915	1919
41	William Begg		1919	1921
42	James Douglas		1921	1923
43	Harold Tapley		1923	1927
44	William Taverner		1927	1929
45	Robert Black		1929	1933
46	Edwin Thoms Cox		1933	1938
47	Andrew Allen		1938	1944
48	Donald Cameron		1944	1950
49	Len Wright		1950	1959
50	Stuart Sidey		1959	1965
51	Russell Calvert		1965	1968
52	Jim Barnes		1968	1977
53	Cliff Skeggs		1977	1989
54	Richard Walls		1989	1995
55	Sukhi Turner		1995	2004
56	Peter Chin		2004	2010
57	Dave Cull		2010	2019
58	Aaron Hawkins		2019	2022
59	Jules Radich		2022	2025
60	Sophie Barker		2025	present
