= 1888 in New Zealand =

- Decades: 1860s; 1870s; 1880s; 1890s; 1900s
- See also: History of New Zealand; List of years in New Zealand; Timeline of New Zealand history

The following lists events that happened during 1888 in New Zealand.

== Incumbents ==
=== Regal and viceregal ===
- Head of State – Queen Victoria
- Governor – Lieutenant-General Sir William Jervois.

=== Government and law ===
The 10th New Zealand Parliament continues.

- Speaker of the House – Maurice O'Rorke.
- Premier – Harry Atkinson.
- Minister of Finance – Harry Atkinson.
- Chief Justice – Hon Sir James Prendergast

=== Main centre leaders ===
- Mayor of Auckland – Albert Devore
- Mayor of Christchurch – Aaron Ayers followed by Charles Louisson
- Mayor of Dunedin – William Dawson followed by Hugh Gourley
- Mayor of Wellington – Samuel Brown

== Events ==
- 25 July: By-election in the Ashley electorate
- 4 August: Reefton Power Station begins operation
- 1 September: 1888 North Canterbury earthquake

=== Undated ===
- First sightings of the dolphin Pelorus Jack in Cook Strait.

== Sport ==
=== Athletics ===
The first New Zealand Championships are held.

==== National Champions, Men ====
- 100 yards – F. Meenan (Otago)
- 250 yards – A. Williams (Canterbury)
- 440 yards – A. Williams (Canterbury)
- 880 yards – Peter Morrison (South Canterbury)
- 1 mile – J. Field (Southland)
- 120 yards hurdles – Godfrey Shaw (Canterbury)
- Long jump – T. Harman (Canterbury)
- High jump – F. Perry (South Canterbury)

=== Horse racing ===
The Auckland Cup of 1887 is moved to January 1888. Future Auckland Cup's are normally scheduled for New Year's Day.

Avondale Racecourse in Auckland is established.

==== Major race winners ====
- New Zealand Cup – Manton
- New Zealand Derby – Manton
- Auckland Cup winner (January) – Nelson (Australian owned)
- Auckland Cup winner (December) – Lochiel
- Wellington Cup winner – Beresford

=== Lawn bowls ===
==== National Champions ====
- Singles – G. White (Milton)
- Fours – R. Churton, L. Oughton, W. Carswell and D. Mackie (skip) (Taieri)

Note: As the New Zealand Bowling Association at this time consists largely of South Island clubs, the first truly "national" championships are not deemed to have begun until 1914.

=== Polo ===
The first polo club in New Zealand is formed in Auckland.

=== Rowing ===
National Championships are held for the first time. They are held at separate venues; the single sculls in Wellington, the coxed fours in Wanganui. From the following year the Championships will be held at a single venue.

==== National Champions (Men) ====
- Single sculls – J. Foster (Napier)
- Coxed fours – Canterbury

=== Rugby union ===
The South Canterbury, Wanganui and Marlborough unions are formed.

The first ever British Isles rugby team tour takes place, visiting New Zealand and Australia. The visitors win all their New Zealand games except for one, losing to Auckland.
The first New Zealand Native team to visit Britain leaves at the end of the year.

=== Shooting ===
Ballinger Belt – Hon Major Purnell (NZ Volunteers)

=== Tennis ===
National championships

- Men's singles – P. Fenwicke
- Women's singles – E. Harman
- Men's doubles – Richard Harman and Frederick Wilding
- Women's doubles – E. Harman and E. Gordon
- Mixed doubles – No competition

== Births ==
- 27 April: Daisy Osborn, artist. (d. 1957)
- 21 June: Cecil King, rugby league footballer. (d. 1975)
- 14 October: Katherine Mansfield, writer. (d. 1923)
- 15 November: Cora Wilding, physiotherapist and artist. (d. 1982)
- 29 November: Thomas Hislop (Jnr), politician and mayor of Wellington. (d. 1965)

== Deaths ==
- 14 March: John Gill, cricketer
- 22 March: James Williamson, politician
- 12 April: Henry Chamberlin, politician
- 14 April: Rēnata Kawepō, Māori leader and missionary
- 28 April: Ngawaka Taurua, Māori rangatira
- 3 June: Joseph Beswick, politician
- 3 July: William Fisher Pearson, poitician
- 14 July: Samuel Revans, politician and journalist
- 27 July: Thomas Potts, naturalist
- 3 August: William Beetham, painter
- 7 August: Albin Martin, painter
- 18 August:
  - James Menzies, politician
  - Tītokowaru, Māori rangatira
- 24 August: Timothy Gallagher, politician
- 30 August: George O'Brien, painter
- 30 September: Henry Maddock, cricketer
- 18 October: Mary Ann Buxton, educator
- 1 November: John Gully, painter
- 10 November: Thomas Henry Fitzgerald, politician
- 28 November: William Meluish, photographer and businessman
- 3 December: Francis Ogilvie-Grant, 10th Earl of Seafield
- 16 December: Henry Cairns, cricketer

date unknown

- John Bacot, politician
- Te Heuheu Tūkino IV, Māori rangatira
- Thomas Wing, mariner

== See also ==
- List of years in New Zealand
- Timeline of New Zealand history
- History of New Zealand
- Military history of New Zealand
- Timeline of the New Zealand environment
- Timeline of New Zealand's links with Antarctica
