= 1891 in New Zealand =

- Decades: 1870s; 1880s; 1890s; 1900s; 1910s
- See also: History of New Zealand; List of years in New Zealand; Timeline of New Zealand history

The following lists events that happened during 1891 in New Zealand.

== Incumbents ==
=== Regal and viceregal ===
- Head of State – Queen Victoria
- Governor – The Earl of Onslow

=== Government and law ===
Following their victory in the 1890 election the Liberal Government forms the 11th New Zealand Parliament, taking office on 24 January. This is the first time a single political party forms a government in New Zealand.

The new Liberal Government restricts future terms of appointment to the Legislative Council to 7 years. Previous appointments have been for life.

- Speaker of the House – William Steward becomes Speaker taking over from Maurice O'Rorke.
- Premier – John Ballance takes office on 24 January, replacing Harry Atkinson.
- Minister of Finance – John Ballance takes office on 24 January, replacing Harry Atkinson.
- Chief Justice – Hon Sir James Prendergast

=== Parliamentary opposition ===
Leader of the Opposition – John Ballance (Liberal Party) until 23 June, then John Bryce (Independent) until 31 August, then William Rolleston (Independent).

=== Main centre leaders ===
- Mayor of Auckland – John Upton followed by William Crowther
- Mayor of Christchurch – Samuel Manning followed by Charles Gray
- Mayor of Dunedin – John Carroll followed by Charles Robert Chapman
- Mayor of Wellington – Arthur Winton Brown

== Events ==
- 13 January – The first public phonograph performance in New Zealand is made at Christchurch.
- 9 March – The Palmerston North to Napier railway line is completed with the opening of the line between Woodville and Palmerston North, through the Manawatū Gorge.
- 17 March – The S.S. Alice is the first mechanically powered vessel to pass through Ohau Channel and the first to operate on Lake Rotoiti. Among the passengers are Governor Onslow and Lady Onslow. (see also 1889)
- 23 June – An earthquake strikes Port Waikato.

== Sport ==
=== Athletics ===
- 12 August Godfrey Shaw sets the first (unofficial) world record by a New Zealander. He runs 57.2 seconds for 440 yards hurdles at the Isle of Man.

National Champions, Men The 440 yards hurdles is held for the first time.

- 100 yards – J. King (Wellington) Race won by W. Macpherson (Australia)
- 250 yards – J. King (Wellington) Race won by W. Macpherson (Australia)
- 440 yards – J. Hutchison (Auckland) Race won by W. Macpherson (Australia)
- 880 yards – Derisley Wood (Canterbury)
- 1 mile – Derisley Wood (Canterbury)
- 3 miles – Derisley Wood (Canterbury)
- 120 yards hurdles – Harold Batger (Wellington)
- 440 yards hurdles – Harold Batger (Wellington)
- Long jump – T. Upfill (Auckland)
- High jump – tie J. Hume (Wellington) and E. Laurie (Auckland)
- Pole vault – T. Upfill (Auckland)
- Shot put – Timothy O’Connor (Auckland)

=== Chess ===
National champion: R.J Barnes of Wellington

=== Boxing ===
- 14 January: Bob Fitzsimmons wins the world middleweight boxing title by beating Jack (Nonpareil) Dempsey.

=== Horse racing ===
==== Harness racing ====
- Auckland Trotting Cup (over 3 miles) is won by Rarus

==== Thoroughbred racing ====
- New Zealand Cup – British Lion
- New Zealand Derby – Florrie
- Auckland Cup – Pinfire
- Wellington Cup – Cynisca

==== Season leaders (1890/91) ====
- Leading flat jockey – G. Collelo

=== Lawn bowls ===
Dissatisfied with their remoteness from the national association the North Island clubs and those from Nelson form a separate Northern Bowling Association. National Champions

- Singles – G. White (Milton)
- Fours – D. Campbell, W. Weir, D. Mackie and W. Carswell (skip) (Taieri)

=== Polo ===
The New Zealand Polo Association is formed from clubs in Auckland, Christchurch, Dunedin, Rangitikei, North Canterbury and Waikari.

- Savile Cup winners – Christchurch

=== Rowing ===
National Champions (Men)

- Single sculls – W. Bridson (Wellington)
- Double sculls – Star
- Coxless pairs – Wellington
- Coxed fours – Wellington

=== Rugby union ===
Provincial club rugby champions include:

see also Category:Rugby union in New Zealand

=== Shooting ===
- Ballinger Belt – Private C. Kruse (Wanganui Rifles)

=== Soccer ===
Provincial Champions: – This is the first year any provincial championship is recorded. Auckland commenced in 1892.

- Wellington: Petone Wanderers

=== Swimming ===
National champions (Men)

- 100 yards freestyle – H. Bailey (Auckland)
- 440 yards freestyle – H. Bailey (Auckland)
- 880 yards freestyle – H. Nicholson (Auckland)

=== Tennis ===
National championships

- Men's singles – J. Marshall
- Women's singles – J. Rees
- Men's doubles – Richard Harman and Frederick Wilding
- Women's doubles – K. Hitchings and E. Gordon

== Births ==
- 13 December: Frank S. Anthony, writer
- 18 December: Tiaki Omana, politician, rugby union player.
- 25 December: Clarrie Grimmett, Australian cricketer.

== Deaths ==
- 5 January: Henry Manders, Member of Parliament.
- 5 June: Harry Farnall, politician.
- 20 July: (in London, England) Frederick Weld, politician and governor.
- 30 September – Christian Toxward, architect

== See also ==
- List of years in New Zealand
- Timeline of New Zealand history
- History of New Zealand
- Military history of New Zealand
- Timeline of the New Zealand environment
- Timeline of New Zealand's links with Antarctica
