= 1890 in New Zealand =

- Decades: 1870s; 1880s; 1890s; 1900s; 1910s
- See also: History of New Zealand; List of years in New Zealand; Timeline of New Zealand history

The following lists events that happened during 1890 in New Zealand.

== Incumbents ==
=== Regal and viceregal ===
- Head of State – Queen Victoria
- Governor – The Earl of Onslow

=== Government and law ===
The 10th New Zealand Parliament continues.

- Speaker of the House – Maurice O'Rorke.
- Premier – Harry Atkinson.
- Minister of Finance – Harry Atkinson.
- Chief Justice – Hon Sir James Prendergast

The number of members of the House of Representatives is cut from 95 to 74. The New Zealand Legislative Council has 39 members.

=== Parliamentary opposition ===
Leader of the Opposition – John Ballance (Liberal Party).

=== Main centre leaders ===
- Mayor of Auckland – John Upton
- Mayor of Christchurch – Charles Louisson followed by Samuel Manning
- Mayor of Dunedin – John Roberts followed by John Carroll
- Mayor of Wellington – Charles Johnston

== Events ==
- The Maritime Strike involves 8000 unionists
- 28 October: The first Labour Day is celebrated (but it is not a public holiday).

== Sport ==
=== Athletics ===
The first athletics team to compete overseas travels to Sydney.

At the National Championships the 3 miles, Pole vault and Shot put are held for the first time.

==== National Champions (Men) ====
- 100 yards – Jack Hempton (Southland)
- 250 yards – Jack Hempton (Southland)
- 440 yards – H. Reeves (Canterbury)
- 880 yards – J. Grierson (Canterbury)
- 1 mile – Peter Morrison (South Canterbury)
- 3 miles – Peter Morrison (South Canterbury)
- 120 yards hurdles – Harold Batger (Wellington)
- Long jump – T. Harman (Canterbury)
- High jump – T. McNaught (Otago)
- Pole vault – D. Robertson (Canterbury)
- Shot put – R. Malcolm (Wellington)

=== Chess ===
- National Champion: H. Hookham (his 2nd title)

=== Horse racing ===
==== Harness racing ====
- The inaugural running of the Auckland Trotting Cup (over 3 miles) is won by Commodore

==== Thoroughbred racing ====
- New Zealand Cup – Wolverine
- New Zealand Derby – Medallion
- Auckland Cup – Crackshot
- Wellington Cup – Cynisca

=== Lawn bowls ===
==== National Champions ====
- Singles – G. White (Milton)
- Fours – W. Savage, V. Parsons, E. Ashby and B. Hale (skip) (Canterbury)

=== Polo ===
The Savile Cup, the premier polo trophy in New Zealand, is held for the first time. It is presented by and named after the aide-de-camp to the Governor of New Zealand, The Earl of Onslow.

- Savile Cup winners – Christchurch

=== Rowing ===
==== National Champions (Men) ====
- Single sculls – T. Sullivan (Wellington)
- Double sculls – Wellington
- Coxless pairs – Wellington
- Coxed fours – Wellington

=== Rugby Union ===
Provincial club rugby champions include:

see also Category:Rugby union in New Zealand

=== Shooting ===
Ballinger Belt – P. Williams (Wellington Navals)

=== Swimming ===
The New Zealand Amateur Swimming Association is formally constituted on 4 January. It is the second national governing body in the world after the A.S.A. of England. A subsequent disagreement between the North and South Island clubs leads to the formation of a rival association in the North Island known as the New Zealand Amateur Swimming Association Registered. The two associations remain apart until uniting on 21 March 1904.

The first national titles are instituted. Each event is held at a separate carnival (this continues until 1905 when a single championships is held for the first time). In the first year there are 2 separate carnivals for 100 yards and thus 2 different champions.

==== National champions (Men) ====
- 100 yards freestyle (Hamilton) – H. Bailey (Auckland)
- 100 yards freestyle (Christchurch) – W. Sneddon (Canterbury)
- 440 yards freestyle – H. Bailey (Auckland)
- 880 yards freestyle – A. Duthie (Auckland)

=== Tennis ===
==== National champions ====
- Men's singles – M. Fenwicke
- Women's singles – E. Gordon
- Men's doubles – M. Fenwicke and J. Jarkine
- Women's doubles – K. Hitchings and E. Gordon

== Organisations ==
- Founding of the Freemasons' Grand Lodge of New Zealand (April)

== Births ==
- 2 December: Robert Macalister, Mayor of Wellington.

== Deaths ==
- 10 February: Joseph May, politician
- 14 April: Allan Kerr Taylor, businessman
- 14 July: Hugh Carleton, politician and "first Member of Parliament".
- 17 July: Richard Turnbull, politician
- 7 December: Henry Richmond, Superintendent of Taranaki.

== See also ==
- List of years in New Zealand
- Timeline of New Zealand history
- History of New Zealand
- Military history of New Zealand
- Timeline of the New Zealand environment
- Timeline of New Zealand's links with Antarctica
