= 1897 in New Zealand =

- Decades: 1870s; 1880s; 1890s; 1900s; 1910s
- See also: History of New Zealand; List of years in New Zealand; Timeline of New Zealand history

The following lists events that happened during 1897 in New Zealand.

== Incumbents ==
=== Regal and viceregal ===
- Head of State – Queen Victoria
- Governor – The term of David Boyle, 7th Earl of Glasgow as Governor ends on 8 February. He is succeeded on 9 August by Sir Uchter John Mark Knox, 5th Earl of Ranfurly

=== Government and law ===
The 13th New Zealand Parliament continues with the Liberal Party in power.

- Speaker of the House – Sir Maurice O'Rorke
- Prime Minister – Richard Seddon
- Minister of Finance – Richard Seddon
- Chief Justice – Hon Sir James Prendergast

=== Opposition Leaders ===
See: Category:Parliament of New Zealand, New Zealand elections

=== Main centre leaders ===
- Mayor of Auckland – Abraham Boardman followed by Peter Dignan
- Mayor of Christchurch – Harry Joseph Beswick followed by Walter Cooper
- Mayor of Dunedin – Hugh Gourley followed by Edward Bowes Cargill
- Mayor of Wellington – Francis Bell

== Events ==
- 3 May: Margaret Cruickshank becomes New Zealand's first registered woman doctor.
- 14 May: Pigeon post is introduced between Auckland and Great Barrier Island.

== Sport ==
=== Athletics ===
National Champions, Men Arthur Holder is the first athlete to win four titles at a single championships (he is also second in the 100 yards).

- 100 yards – Alfred J. Patrick (Wellington)
- 250 yards – Arthur H. Holder (Wanganui)
- 440 yards – Arthur H. Holder (Wanganui)
- 880 yards – James McKean (Auckland)
- 1 mile – James McKean (Auckland)
- 3 miles – E. Reynolds (Auckland)
- 120 yards hurdles – Arthur H. Holder (Wanganui)
- 440 yards hurdles – Arthur H. Holder (Wanganui)
- Long jump – Leonard Cuff (Canterbury)
- High jump – C. Laurie (Auckland)
- Pole vault – tie Jimmy Te Paa (Auckland) and Hori Eruera (Auckland)
- Shot put – Timothy B. O’Connor (Auckland)
- Hammer throw – J. Callender (Auckland)

=== Chess ===
National Champion: R.J. Barnes of Wellington.

=== Golf ===
The National amateur championships were held in Auckland

- Men – D. Pryde (Hutt)
- Women – L. Wilford (Hutt)

=== Horse racing ===
==== Harness racing ====
- Auckland Trotting Cup (over 2 miles) is won by Awahuri

==== Thoroughbred racing ====
- New Zealand Cup – Waiuku
- New Zealand Derby – Multiform
- Auckland Cup – Antares
- Wellington Cup – Strath Braan

==== Season leaders (1896/97) ====
- Top New Zealand stakes earner – Multiform
- Leading flat jockey – R. Derrett

=== Lawn Bowls ===
National Champions

- Singles – W. McLaren (Kaitangata)
- Pairs – W. Cowie and W. Thomson (skip) (Dunedin)
- Fours – H. Nalder, W. Thomas, R. Struthers and H. Thomson (skip) (Christchurch)

=== Polo ===
- Savile Cup winners – Manawatu

=== Rowing ===
National Champions (Men)

- Single sculls – C. Chapman (Wairewa)
- Double sculls – Wairewa, Little River
- Coxless pairs – Picton
- Coxed fours – Queen's Dr, Port Chalmers

=== Rugby union ===
- 1897 New Zealand rugby union tour of Australia

Provincial club rugby champions include:

see also Category:Rugby union in New Zealand

=== Shooting ===
Ballinger Belt – Private A. Ballinger (Wellington Guards)

=== Soccer ===
Provincial league champions:

- Auckland: Auckland United
- Otago: Roslyn Dunedin
- Wellington: Wellington Swifts

=== Swimming ===
National Champions (Men)

- 100 yards freestyle – T. Wauchop (Canterbury)
- 220 yards freestyle – W. Stratton (Canterbury)

=== Tennis ===
National Championships

- Men's singles – J. Marshall
- Women's singles – Kathleen Nunneley
- Men's doubles – H. Parker and C. Gore
- Women's doubles – Kathleen Nunneley and T. Trimmell

== Births ==
- 28 January: Howard Kippenberger, soldier.
- 23 March: Leslie Andrew, soldier.
- 10 August: Maurice Brownlie, rugby union player.
- 2 December: Rewi Alley, writer, educator, friend of China.
- 3 December: John Buckland Wright, engraver and book illustrator.

== Deaths ==
- 22 April: Charles John Taylor, politician (in England).
- 21 May: Abraham Boardman, Mayor of Auckland.
- 23 September: Henry Fish, politician
- 27 September: John Lillie Gillies, politician.
- Mary Anne Rymill, missionary, teacher, nurse and companion (born 1817).

== See also ==
- List of years in New Zealand
- Timeline of New Zealand history
- History of New Zealand
- Military history of New Zealand
- Timeline of the New Zealand environment
- Timeline of New Zealand's links with Antarctica
