= 1886 in New Zealand =

- Decades: 1860s; 1870s; 1880s; 1890s; 1900s
- See also: History of New Zealand; List of years in New Zealand; Timeline of New Zealand history

The following lists events that happened during 1886 in New Zealand.

== Incumbents ==
=== Regal and viceregal ===
- Head of State – Queen Victoria
- Governor – Lieutenant-General Sir William Jervois.

=== Government and law ===
The 9th New Zealand Parliament continues.

- Speaker of the House – Maurice O'Rorke.
- Premier – Robert Stout
- Minister of Finance – Julius Vogel
- Chief Justice – Hon Sir James Prendergast

=== Main centre leaders ===
- Mayor of Auckland – William Waddel followed by Albert Devore
- Mayor of Christchurch – Charles Hulbert followed by Aaron Ayers
- Mayor of Dunedin – John Barnes followed by Richard Henry Leary
- Mayor of Wellington – Arthur Winton Brown

== Events ==
- 11 April: Sinking of the steamer Taiaroa near the mouth of the Waiau Toa / Clarence River with the loss of 34 lives.
- 10 June: Eruption of Mount Tarawera volcano results in the deaths of ~150 people and the (wrongly assumed) destruction of the famous Pink and White Terraces, an error corrected by 2017 research disclosing the locations of the Pink and White Terraces around today's lake.
- 1 September: Police Force Act comes into effect, splitting the New Zealand Police Force from the standing army (and militia).

== Sport ==
=== Cricket ===
The first recorded game of Women's cricket in New Zealand takes place in the Nelson district.

=== Horse Racing ===
==== Major race winners ====
- New Zealand Cup – Spade Guinea
- New Zealand Derby – Disowned
- Auckland Cup – Nelson (Australian owned)
- Wellington Cup – Nelson (Australian owned)

=== Lawn bowls ===
The New Zealand Bowling Association is formed with twelve clubs. Only two clubs (from New Plymouth and Auckland) are from the North Island which will eventually lead to the events of 1891. A national championships is held but the winners are not recorded.

=== Rugby union ===
The Wairarapa and Manawatu unions are formed.

Provincial club rugby champions include:

see also Category:Rugby union in New Zealand

=== Shooting ===
Ballinger Belt – Sergeant Remington (Wanganui)

=== Tennis ===
A national tennis association is convened in Hastings . The first national championships take place later in the 1886–87 season. (see 1887)

== Births ==
- 4 January: Vincent Ward, politician.
- 8 June (in Devonshire): John Weeks, painter.
- 5 August:Charles Boswell, politician.
- 6 August Alice May Palmer, public servant and union official (d. 1977)
- 13 December Charles Moore Bowden, politician

== Deaths ==
- 15 June: Robert Gillies, politician
- 29 July: James Paterson, politician
- 21 September: John Bathgate, politician
- 27 December: William Crompton, politician.

== See also ==
- List of years in New Zealand
- Timeline of New Zealand history
- History of New Zealand
- Military history of New Zealand
- Timeline of the New Zealand environment
- Timeline of New Zealand's links with Antarctica
