= 1896 in New Zealand =

- Decades: 1870s; 1880s; 1890s; 1900s; 1910s
- See also: History of New Zealand; List of years in New Zealand; Timeline of New Zealand history

The following lists events that happened during 1896 in New Zealand.

== Incumbents ==
=== Regal and viceregal ===
- Head of State – Queen Victoria
- Governor – David Boyle, 7th Earl of Glasgow

=== Government and law ===
The Liberal Party is re-elected and begins the 13th New Zealand Parliament.

- Speaker of the House – Sir Maurice O'Rorke
- Prime Minister – Richard Seddon
- Minister of Finance – Joseph Ward resigns on 16 June and is replaced by Richard Seddon
- Chief Justice – Hon Sir James Prendergast
- The Female Law Practitioners Act was passed in 1896, and Ethel Benjamin who had graduated in law from the University of Otago in 1896 was admitted as a barrister and solicitor of the Supreme Court of New Zealand in 1897.

=== Parliamentary opposition ===
Leader of the Opposition – William Russell.

=== Main centre leaders ===
- Mayor of Auckland – James Holland followed by Abraham Boardman
- Mayor of Christchurch – Walter Cooper followed by Harry Joseph Beswick
- Mayor of Dunedin – Nathaniel Wales followed by Hugh Gourley
- Mayor of Wellington – George Fisher

== Events ==
- 26 March: Brunner Mine disaster; 65 miners killed in explosion
- 13 April: National Council of Women of New Zealand is founded, with Kate Sheppard as its first president.
- 30 September: The government increases the New Zealand head tax to £100 per head from £10, and tightens the other restriction to only one Chinese immigrant for every 200 tons of cargo from 100 tons.
- 13 October: First public screening of a motion picture in New Zealand, in Auckland.
- 4 December: 1896 New Zealand general election.

Undated

- Census measures national population as 743,214.

== Media ==
- The Waikato Argus starts publication. The newspaper runs until 1915.
- The Gisborne Times is founded. It became a daily in 1901, and continued to publish until being bought out by The Poverty Bay Herald in 1938.
- July: The Waikato Times and Waikato Advocate merge, and the former moves to daily publication.

== Sport ==
=== Athletics ===
National Champions, Men

- 100 yards – E. Robinson (Canterbury)
- 250 yards – W. Kingston (Otago)
- 440 yards – W. Low (Otago)
- 880 yards – W. Low (Otago)
- 1 mile – W. Bennett (Otago)
- 3 miles – W. Bennett (Otago)
- 120 yards hurdles – W. Martin (Auckland)
- 440 yards hurdles – J. Thomas Roberts (Auckland)
- Long jump – Leonard Cuff (Canterbury)
- High jump – P. Brown (Canterbury)
- Pole vault – tie R. Hunter (Hawkes Bay) and H. Kingsley (Wanganui)
- Shot put – W. Rhodes (Wellington)
- Hammer throw – P. Brown (Canterbury)

=== Chess ===
National Champion: W. Meldrum of Rangitikei.

=== Golf ===
- Men's national amateur champion – M.S. Todd (Otago)
- Women's national amateur champion – L. Wilford (Hutt)

=== Horse racing ===
==== Harness racing ====
- Auckland Trotting Cup (over 3 miles) is won by Fibre

==== Thoroughbred racing ====
- New Zealand Cup – Lady Zetland
- New Zealand Derby – Uniform
- Auckland Cup – Nestor
- Wellington Cup – Brooklet

==== Season leaders (1895/96) ====
- Top New Zealand stakes earner – Euroclydon
- Leading flat jockey – C. Jenkins

=== Lawn Bowls ===
National Champions There are no national championships this year.

=== Polo ===
- Savile Cup winners – Manawatu

=== Rowing ===
National Champions (Men)

- Single sculls – C. Chapman (Wairewa)
- Double sculls – Wairewa, Little River
- Coxless pairs – Canterbury
- Coxed fours – Queen's Dr, Port Chalmers

=== Shooting ===
Ballinger Belt – Sergeant Wakelyn (Honorary Reserve Corps, Christchurch)

=== Soccer ===
Provincial league champions:

- Auckland: Auckland United
- Otago: Roslyn Dunedin
- Wellington: Wellington Swifts

=== Swimming ===
Not held

=== Tennis ===
National Championships

- Men's singles – H. Parker
- Women's singles – Kathleen Nunneley
- Men's doubles – Richard Harman and D. Collins
- Women's doubles – Kathleen Nunneley and T. Trimmell

== Births ==
- 15 June (in England): Archie Fisher, painter. (died 1959)
- 7 July: Harold Beamish, World War I flying ace. (died 1986)

== Deaths ==
- 18 May: Daniel Pollen, politician (born 1813)
- 2 August: James FitzGerald, politician (born 1818).
- 28 August: James Hume, medical doctor (born 1823).

== See also ==
- 1896 New Zealand census
- List of years in New Zealand
- Timeline of New Zealand history
- History of New Zealand
- Military history of New Zealand
- Timeline of the New Zealand environment
- Timeline of New Zealand's links with Antarctica
