= 1883 in New Zealand =

- Decades: 1860s; 1870s; 1880s; 1890s; 1900s
- See also: History of New Zealand; List of years in New Zealand; Timeline of New Zealand history

The following lists events that happened during 1883 in New Zealand.

== Incumbents ==
=== Regal and viceregal ===
- Head of State – Queen Victoria
- Governor – Lieutenant-General Sir William Jervois begins his term on 20 January.

=== Government and law ===
The 8th New Zealand Parliament continues.

- Speaker of the House – Maurice O'Rorke.
- Premier – Frederick Whitaker is replaced by Harry Atkinson on 25 September
- Minister of Finance – Harry Atkinson
- Chief Justice – Hon Sir James Prendergast

=== Main centre leaders ===
- Mayor of Auckland – James Clark followed by William Waddel
- Mayor of Christchurch – George Ruddenklau
- Mayor of Dunedin – James Bryce Thomson followed by William Parker Street
- Mayor of Wellington – George Fisher

== Events ==
- 1 March – A telephone exchange is opened in Wellington (the fourth in New Zealand).
- The Hokitika Guardian and Hokitika Evening Star merge to form the Hokitika Guardian and Star.
- September: The Waikato Mail ceases publication. The Cambridge newspaper started in 1880.
- 19 February: Pacifist leaders Te Whiti o Rongomai and To hu are released from prison, where they had been held without trial since November 1881.
- July: The Waikato Gazette & Thames Valley Recorder begins publishing. It was absorbed by the Cambridge News in 1889.
- the New Zealand Shipping Company was formed in Christchurch.

== Sport ==
=== Cricket ===
- 1882–83 New Zealand cricket season
- 1883–84 New Zealand cricket season

=== Horse racing ===
The New Zealand Cup is so-named, the race having been run under another name since 1865.

- New Zealand Cup winner: Tasman
- New Zealand Derby winner: Oudeis
- Auckland Cup winner: Salvage
- Wellington Cup winner: Mischief

see also Category:Horse races in New Zealand.

=== Rugby ===
The Auckland Rugby Union is formed.

Provincial club rugby champions include:

see also Category:Rugby union in New Zealand

=== Shooting ===
Ballinger Belt: Sergeant Kennedy (Dunedin)

== Births ==
- 14 May – Charlie Seeling (died 1956), rugby (league and union) footballer
- 4 August – Sydney Smith (died 1969), forensic pathologist
- 31 October – Anthony Wilding (died 1915), tennis player

=== Full date unknown ===
- Ngapipi Reweti, land negotiator (died 1957)

== Deaths ==
- 30 March – Edward Graham McMinn (born 1843), politician
- 30 June – William Cutten (born 1822), politician
- 30 December – David Hay (born 1815), nurseryman

== See also ==
- List of years in New Zealand
- Timeline of New Zealand history
- History of New Zealand
- Military history of New Zealand
- Timeline of the New Zealand environment
- Timeline of New Zealand's links with Antarctica
