= 1892 in New Zealand =

- Decades: 1870s; 1880s; 1890s; 1900s; 1910s
- See also: History of New Zealand; List of years in New Zealand; Timeline of New Zealand history

The following lists events that happened during 1892 in New Zealand.

== Incumbents ==
=== Regal and viceregal ===
- Head of State – Queen Victoria
- Governor – The term of The Earl of Onslow ends on 25 February. David Boyle, 7th Earl of Glasgow become Governor from 6 June.

=== Government and law ===
The 11th New Zealand Parliament continues with the Liberal Party in power.

- Speaker of the House – William Steward
- Prime Minister – John Ballance
- Minister of Finance —John Ballance
- Chief Justice – Hon Sir James Prendergast

=== Parliamentary opposition ===
Leader of the Opposition – William Rolleston (Independent).

=== Main centre leaders ===
- Mayor of Auckland – William Crowther
- Mayor of Christchurch – Charles Gray followed by William Prudhoe
- Mayor of Dunedin – Charles Robert Chapman followed by Charles Haynes
- Mayor of Wellington – Francis Bell

=== Athletics ===
- 6 February John H. 'Jack' Hempton equals the World Record for the 100-yard dash with a time of 9.8 seconds at Lancaster Park in Christchurch.
- A 5-man team competes in England and France.

=== National champions (Men) ===
- 100 yards – Jack Hempton (Hawkes Bay)
- 250 yards – Jack Hempton (Hawkes Bay)
- 440 yards – Peter Wood (Canterbury)
- 880 yards – J. Grierson (Canterbury)
- 1 mile – William Burk (Otago)
- 3 miles – Derisley Wood (Canterbury)
- 120 yards hurdles – W. Moir (Canterbury)
- 440 yards hurdles – Harold Batger (Wellington)
- Long jump – T. Upfill (Auckland)
- High jump – F. Meyrick (Canterbury)
- Pole vault – W. West (Canterbury)
- Shot put – Timothy O’Connor (Auckland)

=== Billiards ===
The first firm in the country to manufacture tables begins in Wellington. The sport has been played in the country for the previous decade.

=== Chess ===
National Champion: F.V. Siedeberg of Dunedin.

=== Horse racing ===
==== Harness racing ====
- Auckland Trotting Cup (over 3 miles) is won by Little Ben

==== Thoroughbred racing ====
- New Zealand Cup – St Hippo
- New Zealand Derby – Stepniak
- Auckland Cup – St Hippo
- Wellington Cup – Cynisca

==== Season leaders (1891/92) ====
- Leading flat jockey – T. Redmond

=== Lawn bowls ===
National Champions:

- Singles – W. Carswell (Taieri)
- Fours – N. Fleming, J. Familton, B. Mollison and J. Martin (skip) (Oamaru)

=== Polo ===
- Savile Cup winners – Christchurch

=== Rowing ===
There are now 34 rowing clubs in New Zealand.

==== National champions (Men) ====
- Single sculls – M. Keefe (Auckland)
- Double sculls – Wellington
- Coxless pairs – Star
- Coxed fours – Canterbury

=== Rugby Union ===
Provincial club rugby champions include:

see also Category:Rugby union in New Zealand

=== Shooting ===
- Ballinger Belt – Sergeant Doughty (A Battery)

=== Soccer ===
Provincial Champions:

- Auckland: Alliance Auckland
- Wellington: Queen's Park Wellington

=== Swimming ===
National champions (Men)

- 100 yards freestyle – H. Bailey (Auckland)
- 220 yards freestyle – H. Bailey (Auckland)
- 440 yards freestyle – H. Bailey (Auckland)
- 880 yards freestyle – H. Bailey (Auckland)

=== Tennis ===
New Zealand Championships

- Men's singles – Richard Harman
- Women's singles – D. Douslin
- Men's doubles – Minden Fenwick and F. Logan
- Women's doubles – E. Harman and J. Rees

== Births ==
- 27 January: Henry Ashton "Harry" Highet, engineer, designer of the P class yacht.
- 2 June: Cedric Stanton Hicks, nutrition expert.
- 11 June: William Duncan, rugby union player.
- 13 July: Bertie Victor Cooksley, politician.
- 15 August: Abraham Wachner, 35th Mayor of Invercargill.

== Deaths ==
- 12 March - Paora Tuhaere, Māori leader (born c1825).
- 24 May – Douglas Hastings Macarthur, politician (born 1839).
- 30 May - Jessie Sarah Wright, artist (born 1863).
- 28 June - Harry Atkinson, politician and premier (born 1831).
- 12 November - Joseph Ward, Marlborough politician (born 1817).
- 10 December - Arthur Atkinson, politician (born 1833).

== See also ==
- List of years in New Zealand
- Timeline of New Zealand history
- History of New Zealand
- Military history of New Zealand
- Timeline of the New Zealand environment
- Timeline of New Zealand's links with Antarctica
