= 1893 in New Zealand =

- Decades: 1870s; 1880s; 1890s; 1900s; 1910s
- See also: History of New Zealand; List of years in New Zealand; Timeline of New Zealand history

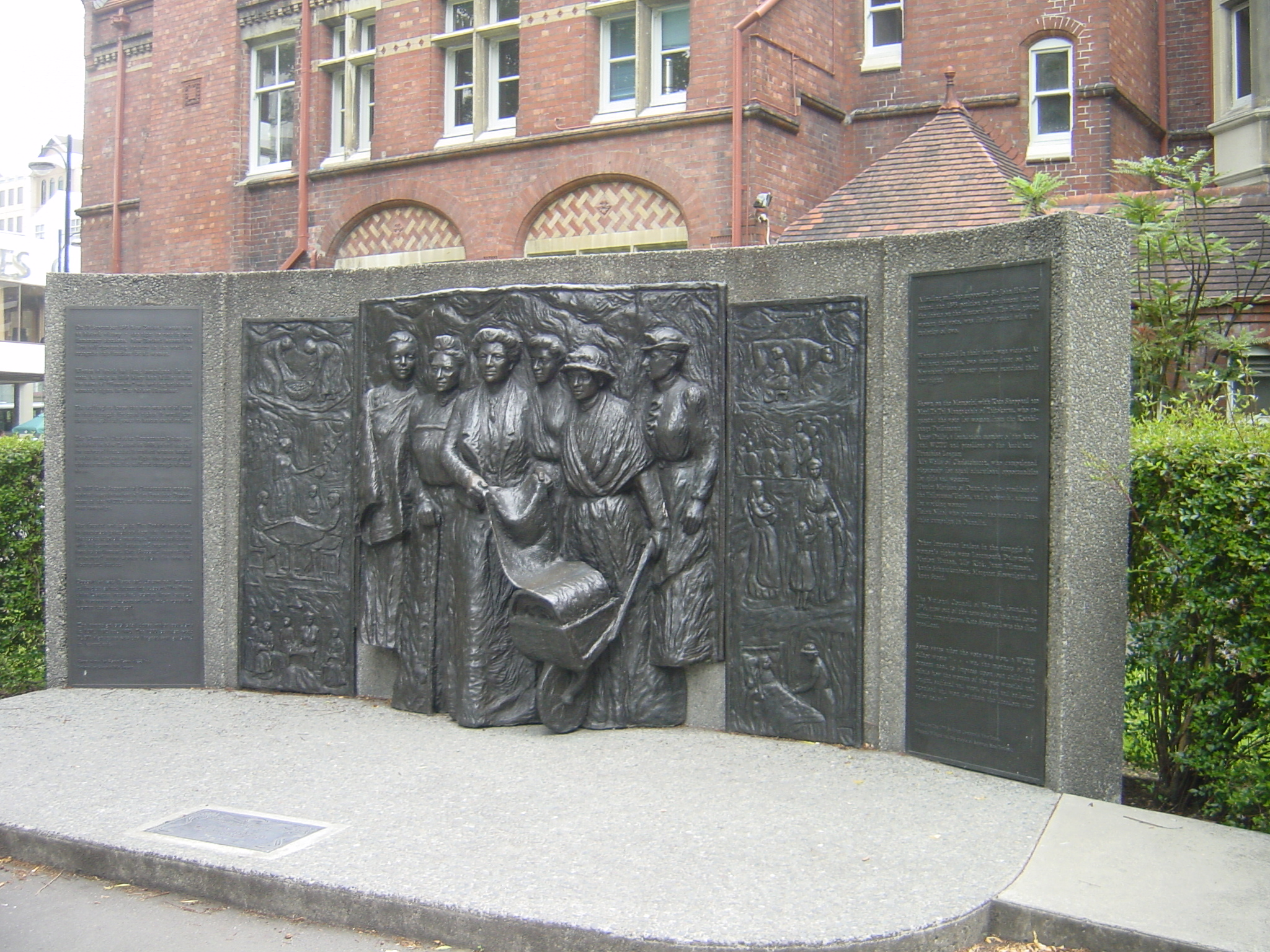
Tribute to the Suffragettes, Christchurch, New Zealand

The following lists events that happened during 1893 in New Zealand.

With the sudden death of John Ballance on 27 April the 13 years of Richard Seddon as prime minister begins. On 28 November New Zealand women become the first in the world to vote in a national election.

== Incumbents ==
=== Regal and viceregal ===
- Head of State – Queen Victoria
- Governor – David Boyle, 7th Earl of Glasgow

=== Government and law ===
The Electoral Bill granting women the franchise is given Royal Assent by Governor Lord Glasgow on 19 September, and women voted for the first time on 28 November (see Women's suffrage in New Zealand).

The Liberal Party is re-elected on 28 November and begins the 12th New Zealand Parliament.

- Speaker of the House – William Steward
- Prime Minister – John Ballance dies on 27 April and Richard Seddon becomes the new prime minister.
- Minister of Finance – On 1 May Joseph Ward becomes Minister of Finance, four days after the death of John Ballance.
- Chief Justice – Hon Sir James Prendergast

=== Parliamentary opposition ===
Leader of the Opposition – William Rolleston (Independent) until 8 November, then William Russell (Independent).

=== Main centre leaders ===
- Mayor of Auckland – William Crowther followed by James Holland
- Mayor of Christchurch – William Prudhoe followed by Eden George
- Mayor of Dunedin – Charles Haynes followed by Henry Fish
- Mayor of Wellington – Francis Bell

== Sport ==
=== Athletics ===
The first Australia and New Zealand Championships are held. Tim O'Connor (in the Shot Put) is the first New Zealander to win an event. These combined Championships are held biennially until 1927 except during World War I.

The hammer throw is held for the first time at a New Zealand National Championships.

==== National Champions, Men ====
- 100 yards – Jack Hempton (Wellington)
- 250 yards – L. Harley (Wellington)
- 440 yards – Norman L. Gurr (Wellington)
- 880 yards – Norman L. Gurr (Wellington)
- 1 mile – C. Rees (Canterbury)
- 3 miles – William J. Burk (Otago)
- 120 yards hurdles – W. Moir (Canterbury)
- 440 yards hurdles – D. Matson (Canterbury)
- Long jump – Ross F. Gore (Wellington)
- High jump – tie Ross F. Gore (Wellington) and F. Meyrick (Canterbury)
- Pole vault – W. West (Canterbury)
- Shot put – O. McCormack (Wellington)
- Hammer throw – O. McCormack (Wellington)

=== Billiards ===
The second firm in the country to begin the manufacture of billiard tables does so in Auckland.

=== Chess ===
National Champion: Franz Vaughan Siedeberg of Dunedin. (his 2nd title)

=== Golf ===
The New Zealand Amateur Championships are held for the first time. They are hosted by the Otago Golf Club and staged at the Balmacewan course.

- National Champion – Men: J. Somerville (Otago)
- National matchplay champion – Women: Mrs. Lomax-Smith (Christchurch)

=== Horse racing ===
==== Harness racing ====
- Auckland Trotting Cup (over 3 miles) is won by Sandfly

==== Thoroughbred racing ====
- New Zealand Cup – Rosefeldt
- New Zealand Derby – Skirmisher
- Auckland Cup – Pegasus
- Wellington Cup – Retina

==== Season leaders (1892/93) ====
- Top New Zealand stakes earner – St Hippo
- Leading flat jockey – T. Buddicombe

=== Lawn Bowls ===
National Champions

- Singles – W. Cowie (Dunedin)
- Fours – W. Barnett, C. Hulbert, H. Toomer and H. Thomson (skip) (Christchurch)

=== Polo ===
- Savile Cup winners: Christchurch

=== Rowing ===
National Champions (Men)

- Single sculls – J. McGrath (Otago)
- Double sculls – Union, Christchurch
- Coxless pairs – Union, Christchurch
- Coxed fours – Lyttelton

=== Rugby union ===
- 1893 New Zealand rugby union tour of Australia

Provincial club rugby champions include:

=== Shooting ===
Ballinger Belt – Private A. Ballinger (Wellington Guards)

=== Soccer ===
Provincial Champions:

- Auckland: Alliance Auckland
- Wellington:Wellington Rovers

=== Swimming ===
National Champions (Men)

- 100 yards freestyle – H. Hodges (Auckland)
- 220 yards freestyle – H. Bailey (Auckland)
- 440 yards freestyle – H. Bailey (Auckland)
- 880 yards freestyle – H. Bailey (Auckland)

=== Tennis ===
National Champions

- Men's singles – M. Fenwicke
- Women's singles – J. Rees
- Men's doubles – Richard Harman and Frederick Wilding
- Women's doubles – Not held

== Births ==
- 30 January: George Yerex, wildlife conservator

== Deaths ==
- 23 January: Henry Driver, politician
- 27 February (in London): Sir Charles Clifford, 1st Baronet, politician, first speaker of the House of Representatives.
- 1 March (in Yorkshire): Mary Taylor, Wellington draper and women's rights advocate.
- 22 March: Theophilus Daniel, politician.
- 27 April: John Ballance, politician & Premier.
- 28 April: Thomas King, politician (born 1821).
- 15 December: Alphonse J. Barrington, gold prospector and explorer (born c. 1832).

== See also ==
- Women's suffrage in New Zealand
- History of New Zealand
- List of years in New Zealand
- Military history of New Zealand
- Timeline of New Zealand history
- Timeline of New Zealand's links with Antarctica
- Timeline of the New Zealand environment
