= 1889 in New Zealand =

- Decades: 1860s; 1870s; 1880s; 1890s; 1900s
- See also: History of New Zealand; List of years in New Zealand; Timeline of New Zealand history

The following lists events that happened during 1889 in New Zealand.

== Incumbents ==
=== Regal and viceregal ===
- Head of State – Queen Victoria
- Governor – The term of Lieutenant-General Sir William Jervois ends on 23 March. The Earl of Onslow takes up the position of governor on 2 May.

=== Government and law ===
The 10th New Zealand Parliament continues.

- Speaker of the House – Maurice O'Rorke.
- Premier – Harry Atkinson.
- Minister of Finance – Harry Atkinson.
- Chief Justice – Hon Sir James Prendergast

=== Parliamentary opposition ===
Leader of the Opposition – John Ballance (Liberal Party). This is the first year in which there is a recognised opposition leader.

=== Main centre leaders ===
- Mayor of Auckland – Albert Devore followed by John Upton
- Mayor of Christchurch – Charles Louisson
- Mayor of Dunedin – Hugh Gourley followed by John Roberts
- Mayor of Wellington – John Duthie

== Events ==
- 21 January – American "Professor" Baldwin makes the first balloon ascent in New Zealand at Dunedin.
- 2 December – The S.S. Alice, the first mechanically powered vessel on the Rotorua Lakes, is launched.

== Arts and literature ==
Reputedly the first science fiction novel written by a New Zealander, Anno Domini 2000, or, Woman's Destiny by former premier Julius Vogel is published.

== Sport ==
=== National Champions, Men ===
- 100 yards – T. Lewis (Hawkes Bay)
- 250 yards – H. Reeves (Canterbury)
- 440 yards – H. Reeves (Canterbury)
- 880 yards – P. Cox (Southland)
- 1 mile – F. Ellis (Hawkes Bay)
- 120 yards hurdles – Harold Batger (Wellington)
- Long jump – Leonard Cuff (Canterbury)
- High jump – T. McNaught (Otago)

=== Chess ===
National Champion: Arthur Ollivier, of Christchurch

=== Horse racing ===
==== Major race winners ====
- New Zealand Cup – Tirailleur
- New Zealand Derby – Scots Grey
- Auckland Cup – Leopold
- Wellington Cup – Dudu

=== Lawn bowls ===
==== National Champions ====
- Singles – H. Toomer (Canterbury)
- Fours – M. Elliott, P. Dow, W. Allnutt and W. Carlton (skip) (Roslyn)

=== Polo ===
The Christchurch Polo Club is formed.

=== Rowing ===
Coxless pairs and Double sculls are held at the championships for the first time.

==== National Champions (Men) ====
- Single sculls – T. McKay (Wellington)
- Double sculls – Wellington
- Coxless pairs – Wellington
- Coxed fours – Wellington

== Rugby union ==
Provincial club rugby champions include:

see also Category:Rugby union in New Zealand

== Shooting ==
Ballinger Belt – Sergeant Parslow (Auckland)

== Tennis ==
After this year the mixed doubles championship are not held again held until 1900.

=== New Zealand championships ===
- Men's singles – P. Fenwicke
- Women's singles – E. Gordon
- Men's doubles – Richard Harman and Frederick Wilding
- Women's doubles – K. Hitchings and E. Gordon
- Mixed doubles – Frederick Wilding and E. Gordon

== Births ==
- 27 February: Melville Lyons, politician
- 19 June: Cora Louisa Burrell, politician (MLC).

== Deaths ==
- 26 July: Thomas Gillies, politician
- 26 July: Arthur Fulton, engineer
- 10 December: Robert Campbell, politician
- 13 December: Sarah Greenwood, artist

== See also ==
- List of years in New Zealand
- Timeline of New Zealand history
- History of New Zealand
- Military history of New Zealand
- Timeline of the New Zealand environment
- Timeline of New Zealand's links with Antarctica
