= 1879 in New Zealand =

- Decades: 1850s; 1860s; 1870s; 1880s; 1890s
- See also: History of New Zealand; List of years in New Zealand; Timeline of New Zealand history

The following lists events that happened during 1879 in New Zealand.

== Incumbents ==
=== Regal and viceregal ===
- Head of State – Queen Victoria
- Governor – The term of The Marquess of Normanby ends on 21 February. Sir Hercules Robinson takes up the appointment on 27 March.

=== Government and law ===
The general election is held between 15 August and 1 September; a law was passed to confirm the result in three electorates (Marsden, Northern Maori and Western Maori); and to clarify the law about electoral petitions (1880). The 7th New Zealand Parliament commences.

- Speaker of the House – Maurice O'Rorke becomes Speaker when his predecessor, Sir William Fitzherbert, is appointed to the Legislative Council.
- Premier – John Hall replaces Sir George Grey on 8 October.
- Minister of Finance – John Hall replaces Sir George Grey on 8 October. Grey had taken up the post on 10 July after John Ballance had resigned on 1 July.
- Chief Justice – Hon Sir James Prendergast

Voting rights are extended to all males.

The term of parliament is reduced from five years to three years.

=== Main centre leaders ===
- Mayor of Auckland – Thomas Peacock
- Mayor of Christchurch – Henry Thomson followed by Charles Thomas Ick
- Mayor of Dunedin – Henry John Walter
- Mayor of Wellington – Joseph Dransfield followed by George Allen followed by William Hutchison

== Events ==
- 21 February: An explosion in the coal mine at Kaitangata kills 34 men.
- 30 March: The Ross Guardian ceases publication. It began in 1866.
- 8 September: A fire sweeps through several buildings in central Dunedin, killing 12 people.
- Education (secular or denominational) was being debated. In two by-elections the winner was described as a Secularist: David Goldie in the 1879 City of Auckland West by-election and Acton Adams in the 1879 City of Nelson by-election. They opposed Curtis's bill before parliament.

== Sport ==
=== Chess ===
- The first New Zealand Chess Championship is held and was won by H. Hookham (Christchurch)

=== Horse racing ===
==== Major race winners ====
- New Zealand Cup – Chancellor
- New Zealand Derby – Hornby
- Auckland Cup – Ariel
- Wellington Cup – Maritana

=== Lawn bowls ===
The first annual competition between clubs from different centres begins between Christchurch and Dunedin clubs.

=== Rugby union ===
- 26 July: The first union in New Zealand, Canterbury Rugby Football Union, is formed at Timaru, incorporating Christchurch, Christ's College, Temuka, North Canterbury, Eastern, South Canterbury, Ashburton, and Southbridge rugby clubs.
- 20 October: The Wellington Rugby Football Union is formed, initially consisting of the Wellington and Athletic clubs.

=== Shooting ===
Ballinger Belt – Corporal W. Ballinger (Wellington)

== Births ==
- 18 January: Agnes Weston, politician (MLC).
- 25 May: Andrew Kennaway Henderson, illustrator, cartoonist and pacifist
- 30 August (in London): Maud Ruby "Daisy" Basham, radio personality.
- 15 June: Miriam Cummings (later Miriam Soljak), activist.
- 28 December: Claude Weston, politician.

== Deaths ==
- 2 February (in England): General Sir Thomas Pratt, commander British forces in NZ 1860–61.
- 3 March: Jerningham Wakefield, politician and pioneer settler.
- 24 April – John Munro, politician (b. 1798/99)
- 14 May: Henry Sewell, politician.
- 14 July: Thomas Outhwaite, first registrar of the Supreme Court.

== See also ==
- List of years in New Zealand
- Timeline of New Zealand history
- History of New Zealand
- Military history of New Zealand
- Timeline of the New Zealand environment
- Timeline of New Zealand's links with Antarctica
