= 1878 in New Zealand =

- Decades: 1850s; 1860s; 1870s; 1880s; 1890s
- See also: History of New Zealand; List of years in New Zealand; Timeline of New Zealand history

The following lists events that happened during 1878 in New Zealand.

== Incumbents ==
=== Regal and viceregal ===
- Head of State – Queen Victoria
- Governor – The Marquess of Normanby

=== Government and law ===
The 6th New Zealand Parliament continues.

- Speaker of the House – Sir William Fitzherbet
- Premier – Sir George Grey
- Minister of Finance – William Larnach resigns on 5 March. He is succeeded by John Ballance on 12 July.
- Chief Justice – Hon Sir James Prendergast

=== Main centre leaders ===
- Mayor of Auckland – Henry Brett followed by Thomas Peacock
- Mayor of Christchurch – James Gapes followed by Henry Thomson
- Mayor of Dunedin – Richard Henry Leary followed by Henry John Walter
- Mayor of Wellington – Joseph Dransfield

== Events ==
- 2 February: Alois Lubecki makes the first telephone call in the country, between Dunedin and Milton. Later in the year the first public demonstration of the telephone is made with a call between Blenheim and Nelson.
- 30 September: Great Flood of 1878, caused by the rapid melting of heavy winter snows in Central Otago, kills at least three people and destroys several bridges in Clutha and Southland.

Undated

- Ashburton is made a borough.

== Sport ==
=== Cricket ===
An Australian team tours New Zealand in January and February, playing seven provincial teams. None of the matches have first-class status as the home sides fielded between 15 and 22 players. A win by the Canterbury XV is the first ever win by a New Zealand side over an international touring team.

- See Australian cricket team in New Zealand in 1877–78

=== Horse racing ===
- New Zealand Cup winner: Maritana
- New Zealand Derby winner: Natator
- Auckland Cup winner: Ariel
- Wellington Cup winner: Lara

=== Rugby union ===
New clubs were formed in Featherston and Carterton, both in the south Wairarapa. Existing football clubs in Gisborne, Palmerston North and Feilding adopted rugby rules.

=== Shooting ===
Ballinger Belt: No competition

== Births ==
- 10 September: Fanny Irvine-Smith, teacher and writer
- 9 May: Jessie Buckland, photographer

== Deaths ==
- 9 February: William Williams, first Bishop of Waiapu.
- 11 February: William Barnard Rhodes, businessman and politician.
- 6 December: Sir John Richardson, politician.
- 25 December Thomas Bartley, politician.

== See also ==
- List of years in New Zealand
- Timeline of New Zealand history
- History of New Zealand
- Military history of New Zealand
- Timeline of the New Zealand environment
