= 1882 in New Zealand =

- Decades: 1860s; 1870s; 1880s; 1890s; 1900s
- See also: History of New Zealand; List of years in New Zealand; Timeline of New Zealand history

The following lists events that happened during 1882 in New Zealand.

One of New Zealand's major industries – export meat – is initiated when the shipping of frozen meat to Britain proves successful.

== Incumbents ==
=== Regal and viceregal ===
- Head of State – Queen Victoria
- Governor – The term of The Hon. Sir Arthur Hamilton-Gordon ends on 24 June. His replacement does not take up his appointment until the following year. (see 1883)

=== Government and law ===
The 8th New Zealand Parliament continues.

- Speaker of the House – Maurice O'Rorke.
- Premier – John Hall resigns on 21 April. He is replaced by Frederick Whitaker who becomes Premier for the second time.
- Minister of Finance – Harry Atkinson
- Chief Justice – Hon Sir James Prendergast

=== Main centre leaders ===
- Mayor of Auckland – James Clark
- Mayor of Christchurch – James Gapes followed by George Ruddenklau
- Mayor of Dunedin – James Gore followed by James Bryce Thomson
- Mayor of Wellington – George Fisher

== Events ==
- 15 February: The Dunedin departs from Port Chalmers carrying the first shipment of frozen meat bound for Britain.
- 26 April – A telephone exchange is opened in Dunedin (the third in New Zealand).

== Sport ==
=== Cricket ===
- 1882–83 New Zealand cricket season

=== Horse racing ===
- New Zealand Cup winner: Welcome Jack
- New Zealand Derby winner: Cheviot
- Auckland Cup winner: Welcome Jack
- Wellington Cup winner: Hilda

see also Category:Horse races in New Zealand.

=== Rugby union ===
The first overseas rugby team visits New Zealand. The Southern Rugby Union from New South Wales wins four of its seven matches. (see also 1884)

Provincial club rugby champions include:

see also Category:Rugby union in New Zealand

=== Shooting ===
Ballinger Belt: Corporal Hutchison (Dunedin)

== Births ==
- 2 January: Jessie Isabel Hetherington, headmistress, lecturer and school inspector (died 1971)
- 27 February: A. N. Field, white supremacist (died 1963)
- 1 June: Jim Thorn, labour leader and politician (died 1956)
- 24 June: Jim Barclay, politician (died 1972)
- 8 August: Alfred Shout, Victoria Cross recipient (died 1915)
- 16 September (in Australia): Freda du Faur, mountaineer. (died 1935)

=== Unknown date ===
- Bernard Martin, politician (died 1956)

== Deaths ==
- 1 April: James Kelham, politician.
- 2 October: Francis Gledhill, politician (born 1803).
- (in England, unknown date) James O'Neill, politician (born 1819).

== See also ==
- List of years in New Zealand
- Timeline of New Zealand history
- History of New Zealand
- Military history of New Zealand
- Timeline of the New Zealand environment
- Timeline of New Zealand's links with Antarctica
