= 1894 in New Zealand =

- Decades: 1870s; 1880s; 1890s; 1900s; 1910s
- See also: History of New Zealand; List of years in New Zealand; Timeline of New Zealand history

The following lists events that happened during 1894 in New Zealand.

== Incumbents ==
=== Regal and viceregal ===
- Head of State – Queen Victoria
- Governor – David Boyle, 7th Earl of Glasgow

=== Government and law ===
The 12th New Zealand Parliament continues with the Liberal Party in power.

- Speaker of the House – Sir Maurice O'Rorke becomes Speaker for the second time, replacing William Steward
- Prime Minister – Richard Seddon
- Minister of Finance – Joseph Ward
- Chief Justice – Hon Sir James Prendergast

=== Parliamentary opposition ===
Leader of the Opposition – William Russell.

=== Main centre leaders ===
- Mayor of Auckland – James Holland
- Mayor of Christchurch – Eden George followed by Thomas Gapes
- Mayor of Dunedin – Henry Fish
- Mayor of Wellington – Alfred Brandon

== Events ==
- 30 October: Luxury steamer SS Wairarapa, carrying 230 passengers from Sydney bound for Auckland, is wrecked on Great Barrier Island with the loss of 135 lives.

Undated

- American balloonist Leila Adair tours New Zealand. She is possibly the first woman to fly in New Zealand.
- New Zealand enacts the world's first national minimum wage law, by the Industrial Conciliation and Arbitration Act.

== Sport ==
Leonard Cuff is appointed a Founding Member of the International Olympic Committee. He remains the member for both New Zealand and Australia until 1905.

=== Athletics ===
National Champions, Men

- 100 yards – Jack Hempton (Wellington)
- 250 yards – H. Reeves (Canterbury)
- 440 yards – W. Low (Otago)
- 880 yards – W. Low (Otago)
- 1 mile – C. Morpeth (Otago)
- 3 miles – C. Morpeth (Otago)
- 120 yards hurdles – Harold Batger (Wellington)
- 440 yards hurdles – Harold Batger (Wellington)
- Long jump – Wallingford Mendelson (South Canterbury)
- High jump – H. Bailey (Wellington)
- Pole vault –H. Kingsley (Wanganui)
- Shot put – O. McCormack (Wellington)
- Hammer throw – O. McCormack (Wellington)

=== Chess ===
National Champion: J. Edwards, of Wellington.

=== Golf ===
- The 2nd National Amateur Championships were held in Christchurch
  - Men: H. Macneil (Otago)
  - Women : Mrs C. Wilder

=== Horse racing ===
==== Harness racing ====
- Auckland Trotting Cup (over 3 miles) is won by Tom Hicks

==== Thoroughbred racing ====
- New Zealand Cup – Impulse
- New Zealand Derby – Blue Fire
- Auckland Cup – Lottie
- Wellington Cup – Vogengang

==== Season leaders (1893/94) ====
- Top New Zealand stakes earner – Blue Fire
- Leading flat jockey – J. Connop

=== Lawn Bowls ===
The pairs championship is held for the first time. National Champions

- Singles – T. Sneddon (Kaituna)
- Pairs – T. Sneddon and H. Reid (skip) (Kaituna)
- Fours – J. Davidson, A. Owen, J. Wedderspoon and J. Evans (skip) (Caledonian)

=== Polo ===
- Savile Cup winners – Rangitikei

=== Rowing ===
National Champions (Men)

- Single sculls – M. Keefe (Auckland)
- Double sculls – Union, Christchurch
- Coxless pairs – Union, Christchurch
- Coxed fours – Lyttelton

=== Rugby union ===
Provincial club rugby champions include:

=== Shooting ===
Ballinger Belt – Captain E. Smith (Dunedin City Guards)

=== Soccer ===
Provincial Champions:

- Auckland: Alliance United
- Wellington: Wellington Rovers
- Otago: Roslyn Dunedin

=== Swimming ===
National Champions (Men)

- 100 yards freestyle – T. Needham (New South Wales, Australia)
- 220 yards freestyle – W. Gormley (New South Wales, Australia)
- 440 yards freestyle – W. Gormley (New South Wales, Australia)
- 880 yards freestyle – W. Gormley (New South Wales, Australia)

=== Tennis ===
National championships

- Men's singles – M. Fenwicke
- Women's singles – M. Spiers
- Men's doubles – J. Marshall and P. Marshall
- Women's doubles – P. Chapman and M. Nicholson

== Births ==
- 2 February – Rongowhakaata Pere Halbert, Māori leader, historian, interpreter, genealogist
- 24 February – Victor Spencer, soldier executed in World War I, pardoned in 2000
- 1 June – Paraire Karaka Paikea, politician
- 14 July: – Paddy Kearins, politician.
- 21 July – Toko Rātana, Rātana church leader and politician
- 13 August: – Fintan Patrick Walsh, trade unionist.
- 10 November: – Andrew Davidson, educationalist

== Deaths ==
- 5 June: Vincent Pyke, politician
- 16 September: Robert Hart, politician.

== See also ==
- History of New Zealand
- List of years in New Zealand
- Military history of New Zealand
- Timeline of New Zealand history
- Timeline of New Zealand's links with Antarctica
- Timeline of the New Zealand environment
