= 1885 in New Zealand =

- Decades: 1860s; 1870s; 1880s; 1890s; 1900s
- See also: History of New Zealand; List of years in New Zealand; Timeline of New Zealand history

The following lists events that happened during 1885 in New Zealand.

== Incumbents ==
=== Regal and viceregal ===
- Head of State – Queen Victoria
- Governor – Lieutenant-General Sir William Jervois.

=== Government and law ===
The 9th New Zealand Parliament continues.

- Speaker of the House – Maurice O'Rorke.
- Premier – Robert Stout
- Minister of Finance – Julius Vogel
- Chief Justice – Hon Sir James Prendergast

=== Main centre leaders ===
- Mayor of Auckland – William Waddel
- Mayor of Christchurch – Charles Hulbert
- Mayor of Dunedin – Arthur Scoular followed by John Barnes
- Mayor of Wellington – George Fisher

== Events ==
- 1 June: The Cambridge News starts publication. It is produced three times a week. The newspaper closed in 1889.
- 1 August: The New Zealand Industrial Exhibition opens in Wellington

== Sport ==
=== Horse racing ===
- New Zealand Cup winner: Fusilade
- New Zealand Derby winner: Stonyhurst
- Auckland Cup winner: Nelson (Australian owned)
- Wellington Cup winner: Mahaki

see also Category:Horse racing in New Zealand.

=== Rowing ===
The Wellington Rowing Club is formed in Wellington.

=== Rugby union ===
The Nelson union is formed. It is now part of the Tasman Rugby Union.

Provincial club rugby champions include:

see also Category:Rugby union in New Zealand

=== Shooting ===
Ballinger Belt: Lieutenant Lucas (Thames)

== Births ==
- 24 February: Charles Cotton, geologist.
- 8 September: Robert Laidlaw, businessman.

== Deaths ==
- 12 June: John Sheehan, politician.
- Full date unknown:
  - William John Larkin, New Zealand priest, Irish nationalist and newspaper proprietor

== See also ==
- List of years in New Zealand
- Timeline of New Zealand history
- History of New Zealand
- Military history of New Zealand
- Timeline of the New Zealand environment
- Timeline of New Zealand's links with Antarctica
