= 1887 in New Zealand =

- Decades: 1860s; 1870s; 1880s; 1890s; 1900s
- See also: History of New Zealand; List of years in New Zealand; Timeline of New Zealand history

The following lists events that happened during 1887 in New Zealand.

== Incumbents ==
=== Regal and viceregal ===
- Head of State – Queen Victoria
- Governor – Lieutenant-General Sir William Jervois.

=== Government and law ===
In the general election on 22 July the Premier Robert Stout loses his seat. A new ministry is formed, the 10th New Zealand Parliament, on 8 October, with Harry Atkinson as Premier, and is announced on 11 October. This is the Atkinson's fourth separate term as Premier.

- Speaker of the House – Maurice O'Rorke.
- Premier – Harry Atkinson replaces Robert Stout
- Minister of Finance – Harry Atkinson replaces Julius Vogel
- Chief Justice – Hon Sir James Prendergast

=== Main centre leaders ===
- Mayor of Auckland – Albert Devore
- Mayor of Christchurch – Aaron Ayers
- Mayor of Dunedin – Richard Henry Leary followed by William Dawson
- Mayor of Wellington – Samuel Brown

== Sport ==
=== Athletics ===
The Canterbury, Hawke's Bay, Otago and Southland clubs form the New Zealand Amateur Athletics Association, now Athletics New Zealand. Auckland refuses to join. The NZAAA is "one of the two oldest national bodies among the members of the IAAF". The first New Zealand Championships will be held towards the end of the 1887–88 season (see 1888).

- 1 October – A. G. Sheath, with Shot Put, 10.21 meters (33.5 ft) at Napier, makes the first performance to be recognised as a national record.

=== Horse racing ===
The Auckland Cup of 1887 is moved to January 1888. Subsequently the Auckland Cup is normally scheduled for New Year's Day.

==== Major race winners ====
- New Zealand Cup – Lochiel
- New Zealand Derby – Maxim
- Auckland Cup – Moved to 1888
- Wellington Cup – Pasha

=== Lawn bowls ===
The first singles championship is held.

==== National Champions ====
- Singles – S. Manning (Christchurch)

=== Rowing ===
The New Zealand Amateur Rowing Association is formed on 16 March. 9 clubs are present. The first Championships are held at the end of the 1887–88 season. (see 1888)

=== Rugby Union ===
The Southland union is formed.

Provincial club rugby champions include:

see also Category:Rugby union in New Zealand

=== Shooting ===
Ballinger Belt – Captain White (Gordon Rifles, Auckland)

=== Tennis ===
The first New Zealand Championships are held.

==== New Zealand championships ====
- Men's singles – P. Fenwicke
- Women's singles – M. Lance
- Men's doubles – P. Fenwicke and M. Fenwicke
- Women's doubles – M. Way and W. Lance
- Mixed doubles – ?. Hudson and K. Hitchings

== Births ==
- 17 March: Mary Patricia Anderson, politician (MLC).
- 31 March: Mary Dreaver, politician (MLC).
- 14 May: Owen Merton, painter.
- 1 September : Harold Caro, Mayor of Hamilton.

== Deaths ==
- 25 February: James Macandrew, politician (born 1819).
- June 1887 – Te Mamaku, Māori chief (b. 1790)

== See also ==
- List of years in New Zealand
- Timeline of New Zealand history
- History of New Zealand
- Military history of New Zealand
- Timeline of the New Zealand environment
- Timeline of New Zealand's links with Antarctica
