= 1877 in New Zealand =

- Decades: 1850s; 1860s; 1870s; 1880s; 1890s
- See also: History of New Zealand; List of years in New Zealand; Timeline of New Zealand history

The following lists events that happened during 1877 in New Zealand.

== Incumbents ==
=== Regal and viceregal ===
- Head of State – Queen Victoria
- Governor – The Marquess of Normanby

=== Government and law ===
The 6th New Zealand Parliament continues.

- Speaker of the House – Sir William Fitzherbet
- Premier – Harry Atkinson is defeated as Premier on 13 October and is replaced by Sir George Grey
- Minister of Finance – When Harry Atkinson is defeated as Premier on 13 October he also loses the position of Treasurer (Minister of Finance). On 15 October William Larnach is chosen as his replacement.
- Chief Justice – Hon Sir James Prendergast

=== Main centre leaders ===
- Mayor of Auckland City – William Hurst followed by Henry Brett
- Mayor of Christchurch – Fred Hobbs followed by James Gapes
- Mayor of Dunedin – Charles Stephen Reeves followed by Richard Henry Leary
- Mayor of Wellington – William Hutchison

== Events ==
- The Treaty of Waitangi ruled a "simply nullity" in "Wi Parata v the Bishop of Wellington"

== Sport ==
=== Athletics ===
The Auckland Amateur Athletic Club is formed.

=== Cricket ===
- The Canterbury Cricket Association is formed.
- An England XI under the leadership of James Lillywhite tours in January and February. None of the fixtures were first class, and all the home sides field teams of between 18 and 22 players. The team went on to Australia to play the first ever Test matches. Itinerary

=== Horse racing ===
- New Zealand Cup winner: Mata
- New Zealand Derby winner: Trump Card
- Auckland Cup winner: Lara
- Wellington Cup winner: Guy Fawkes

see also Category:Horse races in New Zealand.

=== Rugby union ===
- The following rugby clubs were formed: Athletic (Wellington), Waverley, Merivale, Leeston, Southbridge, Rakaia, and Otago University.

=== Shooting ===
Ballinger Belt: Lieutenant Paynter (Nelson)

== Births ==
- 9 April: Jane Mander, novelist
- 18 April Alfred Murdoch, politician.
- 18 April:Arthur Stallworthy, politician.
- 19 April: George Mitchell, soldier and politician
- ca. October: Te Rangi Hīroa (Peter Buck), Māori leader.
- (in England): Thomas Otto Bishop, politician.
- 25 November: Thomas David Burnett, politician.
- 4 December: John Christopher Rolleston, politician.

== Deaths ==
- 5 January: Sir Donald McLean, politician.
- 13 January: Margaret Forbes innkeeper and land protester (born c. 1807)
- 15 February: David Monro, politician.
- 8 November: Alfred Ludlam, politician (born 1810).

== See also ==
- List of years in New Zealand
- Timeline of New Zealand history
- History of New Zealand
- Military history of New Zealand
- Timeline of the New Zealand environment
- Timeline of New Zealand's links with Antarctica
