= 1884 in New Zealand =

- Decades: 1860s; 1870s; 1880s; 1890s; 1900s
- See also: History of New Zealand; List of years in New Zealand; Timeline of New Zealand history

The following lists events that happened during 1884 in New Zealand.

== Incumbents ==
=== Regal and viceregal ===
- Head of State – Queen Victoria
- Governor – Lieutenant-General Sir William Jervois.

=== Government and law ===
The 1884 general election is held on 22 July. Afterwards the 9th New Zealand Parliament is formed.

- Speaker of the House – Maurice O'Rorke.
- Premier – Harry Atkinson loses the Premiership to Robert Stout on 16 August, regains it on 28 August and loses it again to Stout on 3 September.
- Minister of Finance – Harry Atkinson is replaced on 16 August by Julius Vogel. He is relieved of the position on 28 August and resumes it again on 3 September.
- Chief Justice – Hon Sir James Prendergast

=== Main centre leaders ===
- Mayor of Auckland – William Waddel
- Mayor of Christchurch – George Ruddenklau followed by Charles Hulbert
- Mayor of Dunedin – William Parker Street followed by Arthur Scoular
- Mayor of Wellington – George Fisher

== Sport ==
=== Cricket ===
- 1883–84 New Zealand cricket season
- 1884–85 New Zealand cricket season

=== Horse racing ===
- New Zealand Cup winner: Vanguard
- New Zealand Derby winner: Black Rose
- Auckland Cup winner: The Poet
- Wellington Cup winner: The Poet

see also Category:Horse races in New Zealand.

=== Rugby union ===
- 1884 New Zealand rugby union tour of New South Wales: A New Zealand team makes an overseas tour for the first time. The team makes a return visit (see 1882) to the Southern Rugby Union in New South Wales and wins all eight matches with 167 points for and 17 against.

The Hawke's Bay union is formed.

Provincial club rugby champions include:

see also Category:Rugby union in New Zealand

=== Shooting ===
Ballinger Belt: Private Walter Churton (Wanganui)

== Births ==
- 26 February (in Australia): Frederick Doidge, politician (d. 1954).
- 10 March: Adam Adamson, mayor of Invercargill (d. 1984).
- 12 July: Robert McKeen, politician (d. 1974).
- 16 November: Fred Jones, politician (d. 1966).

== Deaths ==
- 28 February: Sir Robert Douglas, 3rd Baronet, soldier and politician
- 1 March: William Jarvis Willis, member of the House of Representatives
- 27 April: Henry Tancred, politician
- 1 June: Robert Heaton Rhodes, member of the House of Representatives
- 27 June: Benjamin Tonks, member of the House of Representatives and Mayor of Auckland City
- 13 July: Francis Hull, member of the House of Representatives
- 23 July: William Adams, member of the House of Representatives and provincial superintendent
- 30 August: William Wood, member of the House of Representatives and provincial superintendent
- 7 September: Alfred Nesbit Brown, missionary
- 28 October: Thomas Luther Shepherd, member of the House of Representatives
- 1 December: William Swainson, first Speaker of the New Zealand Legislative Council
- 11 September: (in England) Walter Brodie, member of the House of Representatives
- 20 December: John George Miles, member of the House of Representatives

== See also ==
- List of years in New Zealand
- Timeline of New Zealand history
- History of New Zealand
- Military history of New Zealand
- Timeline of the New Zealand environment
- Timeline of New Zealand's links with Antarctica
