= 1895 in New Zealand =

- Decades: 1870s; 1880s; 1890s; 1900s; 1910s
- See also: History of New Zealand; List of years in New Zealand; Timeline of New Zealand history

The following lists events that happened during 1895 in New Zealand.

== Incumbents ==
=== Regal and viceregal ===
- Head of State – Queen Victoria
- Governor – David Boyle, 7th Earl of Glasgow

=== Government and law ===
The 12th New Zealand Parliament continues with the Liberal Party in power.

- Speaker of the House – Sir Maurice O'Rorke
- Prime Minister – Richard Seddon
- Minister of Finance – Joseph Ward
- Chief Justice – Hon Sir James Prendergast

=== Parliamentary opposition ===
Leader of the Opposition – William Russell.

=== Main centre leaders ===
- Mayor of Auckland – James Holland
- Mayor of Christchurch – Thomas Gapes followed by Walter Cooper
- Mayor of Dunedin – Henry Fish followed by Nathaniel Wales
- Mayor of Wellington – Charles Luke

== Events ==
- June–August: An unusually severe winter is experienced in the South Island, with many snowfalls and Lyttelton Harbour freezing over on 12 July.
- July: The Waikato Advocate is published in Cambridge. It merged with the Waikato Times in 1896.
- 12 August: Minnie Dean, the only woman to be executed in New Zealand, hanged for murder

Undated

- New Zealander Alexander von Tunzelmann becomes the first person to set foot on Antarctica, at Cape Adare

== Sport ==
=== Athletics ===
National Champions, Men

- 100 yards – Alfred J. Patrick (Wellington)
- 250 yards – L. Broad (Canterbury)
- 440 yards – W. Low (Otago)
- 880 yards – W. Low (Otago)
- 1 mile – A. Davies (Auckland)
- 3 miles – A. Bell (Manawatu)
- 120 yards hurdles – W. Martin (Auckland)
- 440 yards hurdles – F. Harley (Wellington)
- Long jump – J. Ryan (Hawkes Bay)
- High jump – H. Bailey (Wanganui)
- Pole vault – H. Kingsley (Wanganui)
- Shot put – Charles M. Louisson (Canterbury)
- Hammer throw – Charles M. Louisson (Canterbury)

=== Chess ===
National Champion: W. Mackay of Wellington.

=== Golf ===
- National amateur champion (men) – G. Gossett (Christchurch)
- National amateur champion (women) – Mrs ? Melland

=== Horse racing ===
==== Harness racing ====
- Auckland Trotting Cup (over 2 miles) is won by Old Judge

==== Thoroughbred racing ====
- New Zealand Cup – Euroclydon
- New Zealand Derby – Euroclydon
- Auckland Cup – Anita
- Wellington Cup – Mahaki

==== Season leaders (1894/95) ====
- Top New Zealand stakes earner – Mahaki
- Leading flat jockey – R. Derrett

=== Lawn Bowls ===
National Champions

- Singles – W. McLaren (Kaitangata)
- Pairs – R. Struthers and W. Barnett (skip) (Christchurch)
- Fours – H. Reid, A. Tapper, A. McDonald and T. Sneddon (skip) (Kaituna)

=== Polo ===
- Savile Cup winners – Manawatu

=== Rowing ===
National Champions (Men)

- Coxed fours – Queen's Dr, Port Chalmers
- Coxless pairs – Union, Christchurch
- Double sculls – Union, Christchurch
- Single sculls – J. McGrath (Dunedin Amateur)

=== Rugby union ===
Provincial club rugby champions include:

see also Category:Rugby union in New Zealand

=== Shooting ===
Ballinger Belt – W. Ballinger (Petone Rifle Club)

=== Soccer ===
Provincial league champions:

- Auckland: Auckland United
- Otago: Roslyn Dunedin
- Wellington: Wellington Swifts

=== Swimming ===
National Champions (Men)

- 100 yards freestyle – L. Leo (New South Wales, Australia)
- 220 yards freestyle – L. Leo (New South Wales, Australia)
- 440 yards freestyle – L. Leo (New South Wales, Australia)
- 880 yards freestyle – L. Leo (New South Wales, Australia)

=== Tennis ===
National Championships

- Men's singles – J. Hooper
- Women's singles – K. Hitchings
- Men's doubles – Richard Harman and Frederick Wilding
- Women's doubles – C. Lean and E. Black

== Births ==
- 5 January: Eruera Tirikatene, politician. (d. 1967)
- 2 February: Ethel Gould, politician (MLC). (d. 1992)
- 1 April: Alexander Aitken, mathematician. (d. 1967)
- 15 April: Clark McConachy, snooker and billiards player (d. 1980)
- 2 June: George Jobberns, academic. (d. 1974)
- 6 August: Cyril Brownlie, rugby union player. (d. 1954)
- 23 August: Thomas Ashby, mayor of Auckland (d. 1957)
- 3 October: Ernest Toop (in England), politician, mayor of Wellington (d. 1976)
- 16 October: Keith Caldwell, WWI flying ace. (d. 1980)
- 9 December: Whina Cooper, Māori leader. (d. 1994)
- 23 December: Nola Luxford, Hollywood actress. (d. 1994)

== Deaths ==
- 14 July: Ernest Gray, politician and farmer.
- 7 September: Walter Mantell, scientist and politician.

== See also ==
- History of New Zealand
- List of years in New Zealand
- Military history of New Zealand
- Timeline of New Zealand history
- Timeline of New Zealand's links with Antarctica
- Timeline of the New Zealand environment
