= Luanna Meyer =

Emeritus professor of education in New Zealand

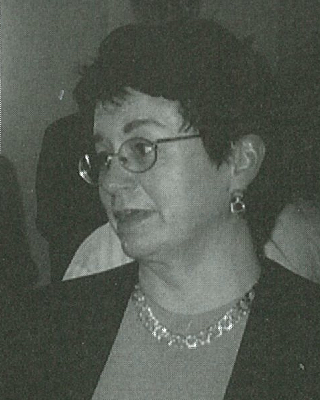
- Meyer in 2000
- Born: 29 March 1945 (age 81); Minneapolis, Minnesota, U.S.

Academic background
- Education: University of Wisconsin–Madison, Indiana University Bloomington
- Thesis: An analysis of the linguistic behaviors of severely developmentally handicapped children diagnosed as autistic (1976)

Luanna Hazel Meyer (born 1945) also known as Luanna Voeltz, is an American–New Zealand academic, and is professor emerita of education at Victoria University of Wellington. She worked on inclusive education and teacher development in America and New Zealand.

== Early life and education ==
Meyer was born in 1945 and grew up in Oshkosh, Wisconsin. She calls it a "typical American town", and noted that she never saw anyone with disabilities at her school or in her community, other than one friend who had polio. Outside Oshkosh was the Winnebago Mental Health Institute which was for adults, but also had an autism unit and a children's unit. Meyer volunteered at the Institute as a teenager, and her experiences there led to her studying the unit during her PhD research at the Indiana University Bloomington. Her thesis was titled An analysis of the linguistic behaviors of severely developmentally handicapped children diagnosed as autistic, and examined echolalia from a linguistic perspective.

== Academic career ==
After graduation, Meyer took a one year visiting fellowship to the University of Hawai'i. By this time she knew she was interested in severe disabilities, and "it was the only job in the country at the time that included emotional disturbance, behaviour disorders and severe disabilities". Meyer was in Hawai'i when the Education for All Handicapped Children Act came into force in 1975, which specified disabled children should receive equal access to education. Meyer and her three colleagues were in a small unit which was the only one in the state, "We read the law which said that children should be educated in their neighbourhood school etc., etc. and we didn’t know what everyone else was doing. So little Hawaii out there in the Pacific Ocean didn’t know everyone else ignored all those parts of the law. We just read the law and we said “Oh alright, we have to put them all in schools” and it was great. Every child was de-institutionalised and put into one of the regular schools, in a special class, and we did it over a period of three years." Meyer began working in inclusion, and developed relationships with James Apffel and Ian Evans, later professor emeritus of Massey University. Meyer moved to the University of Minnesota in 1982 to demonstrate that the inclusion methods she was using in Hawai'i could be successful in other places, and then worked at Syracuse University, developing inclusive classrooms across New York. By this time Meyer and Evans were married.

In 1987 Meyer was invited by Anne Bray to take an endowed chair at the Roy McKenzie Institute of Mental Retardation, at the University of Otago in Dunedin. Evans and Meyer spent six months in Dunedin, with Meyer travelling the country promoting inclusive education. Later Evans took a position at the University of Waikato, and Meyer at Massey University. Meyer later joined the faculty of Victoria University of Wellington, where she was the founding Director of the Jessie Hetherington Centre for Educational Research at Victoria, which was launched in 2006. Hetherington was the first woman to teach the history of education in a New Zealand university, and the centre's goal is to "enhance theoretical and evidence-based educational policy and practice from early childhood to higher education". Meyer retired in 2012.

== Selected works ==
- Robin Averill; Anne Hynds; Rawiri Hindle; Meyer, Luanna Hazel (2015). ""Every teacher has to come on board for our Māori students" He wero mō ngā kaiarahi wāhanga ako—the challenge for curriculum leaders". set Research Information for Teachers (3): 3–11. doi:10.18296/set.0021. Wikidata Q126390821.
- Shane T Harvey; Diana Boer; Meyer, Luanna Hazel; Evans, Ian John William (2009). "Updating a meta-analysis of intervention research with challenging behaviour: treatment validity and standards of practice". Journal of Intellectual & Developmental Disability. 34 (1): 67–80. doi:10.1080/13668250802690922. PMID 19234980. Wikidata Q51851105.
- McClure, John; Meyer, Luanna Hazel; Jessica Garisch; Fischer, Ronald; Kirsty F. Weir; Frank H. Walkey (2011). "Students' attributions for their best and worst marks: Do they relate to achievement?". Contemporary Educational Psychology. 36 (2): 71–81. doi:10.1016/j.cedpsych.2010.11.001. Wikidata Q58340871.
- Meyer, Luanna Hazel; McClure, John; Frank Walkey; Kirsty F Weir; Lynanne McKenzie (2008). "Secondary student motivation orientations and standards-based achievement outcomes". British Journal of Educational Psychology. 79 (Pt 2): 273–293. doi:10.1348/000709908x354591. PMID 18851770. Wikidata Q48320870.
- Meyer, Luanna Hazel (2007). "Collegial participation in university governance: a case study of institutional change". Studies in Higher Education. 32 (2): 225–235. doi:10.1080/03075070701267269. Wikidata Q123127151.
- Louise Starkey; Yates, Anne; Meyer, Luanna Hazel; Cedric Hall; Mike Taylor; Susan Stevens; Rawiri Toia (2009). "Professional development design: Embedding educational reform in New Zealand". Teaching and Teacher Education. 25 (1): 181–189. doi:10.1016/j.tate.2008.08.007. Wikidata Q58775752.
- Mike Taylor; Yates, Anne; Meyer, Luanna Hazel; Kinsella, Penelope Dale (2011). "Teacher professional leadership in support of teacher professional development". Teaching and Teacher Education. 27 (1): 85–94. doi:10.1016/j.tate.2010.07.005. Wikidata Q58775741.
