= List of Masonic Grand Lodges in Australia and Oceania =

This is a list of all verifiable organizations that claim to be a Masonic Grand Lodge in Australia and Oceania.

== Australia and Oceania ==
| Country or Greater Geographical Area | State, Province, or Other Geographical Area | Grand Lodge Name | Founded | Lodges | Members | Notes |
|---|---|---|---|---|---|---|
| Australia | New South Wales and the Australian Capital Territory | United Grand Lodge of New South Wales and the Australian Capital Territory | 1888 | 323 | 12,000 | |
| Australia | Queensland | United Grand Lodge of Queensland | 1921 | 284 | 8,560 | |
| Australia | South Australia and Northern Territory | Grand Lodge of South Australia and Northern Territory | 1884 | 105 | 2,896 | |
| Australia | Tasmania | Grand Lodge of Tasmania | 1890 | 41 | 1,250 | |
| Australia | Victoria | United Grand Lodge of Victoria | 1889 | 233 | 7,561 | |
| Australia | Western Australia | Grand Lodge of Western Australia | 1900 | 131 | 4,100 | |
| Australia | Queensland | District Grand Lodge of Northern Queensland | 1921 | 20 | | A unit of the United Grand Lodge of Queensland |
| Australia | Queensland | District Grand Lodge of Carpentaria | | 25 | | A unit of the United Grand Lodge of Queensland |
| Australia | Western Australia | District Grand Lodge of Western Australia | | 9 | | A unit of the Grand Lodge of Scotland |
| Australia | Western Australia | District Grand Lodge of Western Australia, Goldfields District | | 4 | | A unit of the Grand Lodge of Scotland |
| New Caledonia | New Caledonia, France | Provincial Grand Lodge of New Caledonia | 1997 | | | A unit of the Grande Loge Nationale Française |
| New Zealand | | Grand Lodge of New Zealand | 1890 | 165 | 4,553 | |
| New Zealand | North Island, New Zealand | District Grand Lodge of North Island, New Zealand | | | | A unit of the United Grand Lodge of England |
| New Zealand | South Island, New Zealand | District Grand Lodge of South Island, New Zealand | | | | A unit of the United Grand Lodge of England |
| New Zealand | | Provincial Grand Lodge of New Zealand | 1859 | 4 | | A unit of the Grand Lodge of Ireland |
| New Zealand | North Island, New Zealand | District Grand Lodge of North Island, New Zealand | | 4 | | A unit of the Grand Lodge of Scotland |
| New Zealand | South Island, New Zealand | District Grand Lodge of New Zealand South | | 6 | | A unit of the Grand Lodge of Scotland |

== See also ==
- List of Masonic Grand Lodges
