= New Zealand Soldiers' Club =

The New Zealand Soldiers' Club, housed at 17 Russell Square, in London, provided food and accommodation for New Zealand soldiers on leave from the battlefront in France during World War I. From 1916 to 1919, the club housed, clothed and fed over 100,000 soldiers. Almost all were met personally by the club's committee as they disembarked from trains returning to London from France.

Prior to August 1916, New Zealand soldiers on leave were given temporary accommodation in a number of YMCA hostels across London. The New Zealand War Contingent Association recognised that a place was needed to provide basic but comfortable living quarters for able-bodied and wounded soldiers when on leave in the UK.

== History ==
The New Zealand Soldiers' Club was originally in three private houses, located at 17, 18 and 19 Russell Square in London. It was opened on 1 August 1916 by Sir Thomas Mackenzie, of the New Zealand High Commission. The house at No. 17 originally belonged to Sir Alexander Meadows Rendel, one of a family of British civil engineers. Sir Alexander gave the house rent-free to the club in memory of his late wife Lady Elizabeth Rendel, the daughter of Captain William Hobson, the first Governor of New Zealand.

The club was staffed by New Zealand volunteers as stipulated by the New Zealand War Contingent Association. In his opening speech, Sir Thomas Mackenzie stated that committee members would meet each train from France to "prevent the harpies and sharpers who are always hanging about the Metropolis from decoying the men".

The building was demolished after World War II and replaced by buildings designed by architect Sir Denys Lasdun for the University of London. In 1975, No. 17 became the Institute of Advanced Legal Studies (IALS). The existence of the club was forgotten until 2008 when, as part of its 60th anniversary, the institute was researching its own history and found references in the archive to the older building at 17 Russell Square. Some pictures and a brief history of the New Zealand Soldiers' Club are on its website.

=== Honorary club secretary ===
The first and only secretary was R. H. Nolan. Nolan was honorary club secretary and one of the first to recognise the importance of a permanent hostel for soldiers on leave. In a letter, published in Press, a New Zealand Newspaper, he describes his role and day-to-day management of the club:

"My office is in the premises, so I practically live on the spot, but visit the family occasionally. "Our charge is 3s per day. Breakfast, lunch, bed. 8d each, dinner 1s, baths free. Every man from the trendies gets a clean suit of underclothing and pyjamas. The discarded ones are sterilised, washed, and mended (if worth renovating). They then come in for others. l am working it mostly by orderlies who are convalescent and not fit to return to France. There is also a canteen which is never closed day or night. This is all worked by voluntary labour, and waiting in the dining-room is also voluntary. Scrubbing, etc. is done by charwomen. When in full work, we expect to serve over 6000 meals a week, as lots of convalescents from hospitals come in for a meal."

=== Personal descriptions of the club ===
The club is described by John ("Jack") Daniels, a New Zealand soldier writing to his family in the latter years of the Great War, as having "Fine billiard-room, reading and writing rooms, and every convenience and comfort. Beds for 200 men. Canteen for light refreshments, open day and night. Run by N.Z. ladies. Tariff: dinner, 1s.; bed, breakfast and tea, 8d."

== See also ==
- George Franklyn Yerex
- New Zealand Forces Club
