= 1880 in New Zealand =

- Decades: 1860s; 1870s; 1880s; 1890s; 1900s
- See also: History of New Zealand; List of years in New Zealand; Timeline of New Zealand history

The following lists events that happened during 1880 in New Zealand.

== Incumbents ==
=== Regal and viceregal ===
- Head of State – Queen Victoria
- Governor – Sir Hercules Robinson leaves on 9 September to take up the position of High Commissioner in South Africa. The Hon. Sir Arthur Hamilton-Gordon becomes Governor on 29 November.

=== Government and law ===
The 7th New Zealand Parliament continues.

- Speaker of the House – Maurice O'Rorke.
- Premier – John Hall (New Zealand)
- Minister of Finance – Harry Atkinson
- Chief Justice – Hon Sir James Prendergast

=== Main centre leaders ===
- Mayor of Auckland – Thomas Peacock followed by James Clark
- Mayor of Christchurch – Charles Thomas Ick
- Mayor of Dunedin – Archibald Hilson Ross
- Mayor of Wellington – William Hutchison

== Events ==
- September: The Waikato Mail begins publishing in Cambridge. The newspaper is produced three times a week. It ceases to publish in 1883.

=== Undated ===
Wellington Teachers' College is opened.

== Sport ==
=== Horse racing ===
- New Zealand Cup winner: Le Loup
- New Zealand Derby winner: Sir Mordred
- Auckland Cup winner: Foul Play
- Wellington Cup winner: Foul Play

see also Category:Horse races in New Zealand.

=== Rugby union ===
The Wellington Union is the first to hold a club championships.

==== Provincial club rugby champions ====
Wellington: Athletic

=== Shooting ===
Ballinger Belt: Sergeant Okey (Taranaki)

=== Swimming ===
The first swimming club in New Zealand, Christchurch Amateur Swimming Club, is formed on 11 October. It is soon followed by others throughout New Zealand.

=== Tennis ===
Prior to this year there are tennis clubs in Auckland, Christchurch and Dunedin. As well as tennis club members also play croquet, bowls and archery.

== Births ==
- 3 August: Arthur Hall, politician.

== Deaths ==
- 9 March: Edward Hargreaves, Member of Parliament.
- 12 March: Thomas Birch, Member of Parliament
- 27 July: David Forsyth Main, Member of Parliament.

== See also ==
- List of years in New Zealand
- Timeline of New Zealand history
- History of New Zealand
- Military history of New Zealand
- Timeline of the New Zealand environment
- Timeline of New Zealand's links with Antarctica
