= 1881 in New Zealand =

- Decades: 1860s; 1870s; 1880s; 1890s; 1900s
- See also: History of New Zealand; List of years in New Zealand; Timeline of New Zealand history

The following lists events that happened during 1881 in New Zealand.

== Incumbents ==
=== Regal and viceregal ===
- Head of State – Queen Victoria
- Governor – The Hon. Sir Arthur Hamilton-Gordon

=== Government and law ===
The general election is held on 9 December. Afterwards the 8th New Zealand Parliament begins.

- Speaker of the House – Maurice O'Rorke.
- Premier – John Hall (New Zealand)
- Minister of Finance – Harry Atkinson
- Chief Justice – Hon Sir James Prendergast

=== Main centre leaders ===
- Mayor of Auckland – James Clark
- Mayor of Christchurch – Charles Thomas Ick followed by James Gapes
- Mayor of Dunedin – Archibald Hilson Ross followed by James Gore
- Mayor of Wellington – William Hutchison

== Events ==
- The government passes the Chinese Immigration Act 1881. This imposes a £10 tax per Chinese person entering New Zealand, and permits only one Chinese immigrant for every 10 tons of cargo.
- 1 October – The first telephone exchange in New Zealand is opened in Christchurch.
- 24 October – A telephone exchange is opened in Auckland.
- 5 November – The invasion of Parihaka by a colonial militia aiming to clear the non-violent resistance movement and enable the subdivision of land for European settlement
- 5 December – a magnitude 6.0 earthquake strikes near Castle Hill, widely felt in the South Island and causing damage in Christchurch

== Sport ==
=== Cricket ===
- The Auckland Association is formed.
- An Australian team tours the country playing twelve matches against provincial teams. None of the games have first-class status, with the home teams fielding between 12 and 22 players. Australia suffered one loss, but 10 wickets to the Wanganui XXII. Itinerary

=== Horse racing ===
- New Zealand Cup winner: Grip
- New Zealand Derby winner: The Dauphin
- Auckland Cup winner: King Quail
- Wellington Cup winner: Natator

=== Rugby union ===
The Otago union is formed.

Provincial club rugby champions include:

see also Category:Rugby union in New Zealand

=== Shooting ===
Ballinger Belt: Lieutenant Paynter (Nelson)

== Births ==
- 16 January: Hercules Wright, rugby union player.
- 14 February (in Australia): George Skellerup, industrialist
- 6 April: Walter Broadfoot, politician.

== Deaths ==
- 15 September William Sefton Moorhouse, politician.

=== Unknown date ===
- Paora Te Potangaroa, Māori prophet.

== See also ==
- List of years in New Zealand
- Timeline of New Zealand history
- History of New Zealand
- Military history of New Zealand
- Timeline of the New Zealand environment
- Timeline of New Zealand's links with Antarctica
