= Alexander Cairns (cricketer) =

New Zealand cricketer

Personal information
- Full name: Alexander Edmond Cairns
- Born: 23 April 1850; Newlands, Renfrewshire, Scotland
- Died: 16 June 1936 (aged 86); Dunedin, Otago, New Zealand
- Batting: Right-handed

Domestic team information
- Years: Team
- 1867/68–1870/71: Otago
- Source: Cricinfo, 5 May 2016

Alexander Cairns (23 April 1850 – 16 June 1936) was a New Zealand cricketer. He played three first-class matches for Otago between the 1867–68 and 1870–71 seasons. All three matches he played in were against Canterbury and were the only first-class matches played in New Zealand during these seasons, although Cairns did not play in the 1869–70 season's match between the two sides. He scored a total of 39 runs and took eight wickets.

Cairns was born at Newlands near Glasgow in Scotland and educated at Otago Boys' High School in Dunedin. He worked as an employee of railway companies. His brother Henry Cairns also played for Otago. Cairns died at Dunedin in 1936 aged 86.
