= Charles Cuff =

New Zealand cricketer

Personal information
- Full name: Charles Albert Cuff
- Born: 10 July 1877; Christchurch, New Zealand
- Died: 30 June 1942 (aged 64); Christchurch, New Zealand
- Relatives: Leonard Cuff (cousin)
- Source: Cricinfo, 15 October 2020

Charles Albert Cuff (10 July 1877 – 30 June 1942) was a New Zealand cricketer. He played in two first-class matches for Canterbury in 1907/08.

== See also ==
- List of Canterbury representative cricketers
