= John Benjamin Russell =

New Zealand lawyer, businessman, and landscape gardener

John Benjamin Russell (1834–1894), known in his earlier life as John Russell and later as J. B. Russell, was a New Zealand lawyer, businessman and landscape gardener. He was born in Maitland, New South Wales, Australia in 1834.
