= David Hay (nurseryman) =

Scottish nurseryman (1815–1883)

David Hay (2 October 1815 – 30 December 1883) was a Scottish nurseryman active in New Zealand. He was born in Rhynd, Perthshire, Scotland.
