= Henry Cairns =

New Zealand cricketer

Personal information
- Full name: Henry Wilson Cairns
- Born: 11 December 1842; Falkirk, Scotland
- Died: 16 December 1888 (aged 46); Dunedin, New Zealand

Domestic team information
- Years: Team
- 1864/65–1869/70: Otago
- Source: ESPNcricinfo, 6 May 2016

Henry Wilson Cairns (11 December 1842 – 16 December 1888) was a New Zealand cricketer. He played four first-class matches for Otago between the 1864–65 and 1869–70 seasons, all against Canterbury. He had played for an Otago team of 22 players in February 1864 against a touring English team organised by George Parr but had not played in the inaugural first-class match in New Zealand earlier in the year.

Cairns was born at Falkirk in Scotland in 1842. He worked as a salesman. His younger brother, Alexander Cairns, was also born in Scotland but educated at Otago Boys' High School in Dunedin. Cairns died in 1888 at Dunedin asylum.
