= William John Larkin =

William John Larkin (–1885) was a New Zealand priest, Irish nationalist and newspaper proprietor. He was born in County Galway, Ireland. He trained for the priesthood at St. Patrick's College, Maynooth and was ordained in 1860 for the Clonfert diocese.
