= Mary Anne Rymill =

English missionary (1817–1897)

- Born: 1817; London, England
- Died: 1897 (aged 79–80)
- Occupations: missionary, teacher, nurse
- Known for: immigrant to New Zealand

Mary Anne Rymill (1817–1897) was a New Zealand missionary, teacher, nurse and companion.

== Biography ==
She was born in c. 1817 to William and Mary Rymill. Her parents died when she was a child and she lived with her aunt in London, England. She immigrated to New Zealand.

She died on 18 December 1897.
