= Albin Martin =

New Zealand artist, farmer and politician

Albin Martin (c.1813 – 7 August 1888) was a New Zealand artist, farmer and politician. He was born in Stower Provost, Dorset, England, in c. 1813.
