= Henry Maddock (cricketer) =

New Zealand cricketer

- Maddock in the 1860s

Personal information
- Full name: Henry Dyer Maddock
- Born: 1836; Canada
- Died: 30 September 1888 (aged 52); Woollahra, New South Wales

Domestic team information
- Years: Team
- 1863/64–1869/70: Otago
- Source: Cricinfo, 16 May 2016

Henry Dyer Maddock (1836 – 30 September 1888) was a New Zealand cricketer. He played four first-class matches for Otago between 1864 and 1869. Born in Canada, he practised law in New Zealand and Australia.

== Life and career ==
Maddock was born in Canada, and his family moved to Australia in 1853. He married Emma Mary Anne Evans in Melbourne in April 1859. He was admitted to practise as a barrister and solicitor in Dunedin in November 1862. He became a partner in a law firm in Dunedin.

Maddock captained Otago in their match against Southland in January 1864, taking 5 for 16 and 7 for 23 in an innings victory. A few days later he was a member of the Otago team that defeated Canterbury in the first first-class match in New Zealand. He also captained Otago in his last match, a victory over Canterbury in December 1869. When the touring English team played Otago in February 1864, Maddock was the only Otago batsman to reach double figures in the first innings.

Later Maddock moved back to Australia and lived in the Sydney suburb of Woollahra, working as an examiner of titles. His first wife Emma died in Sydney in July 1878. He married Georgina Eliza Logie in Parramatta in September 1878. He died at his home in Woollahra in September 1888, aged 52.
