= William Meluish =

New Zealand photographer and businessman

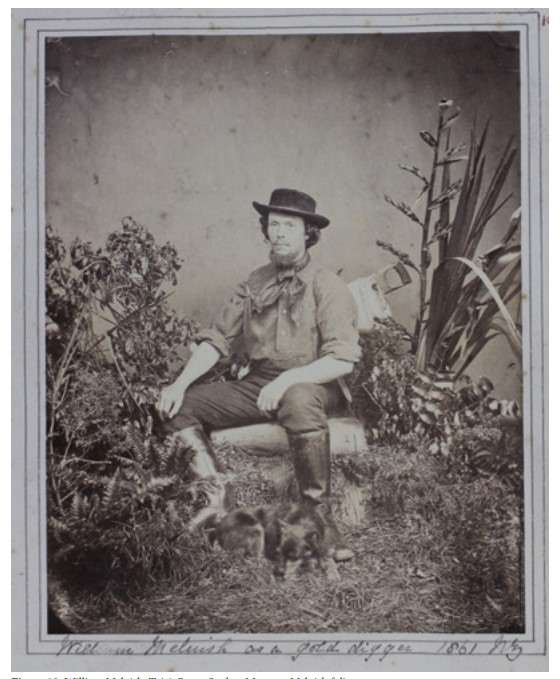
William Meluish as a gold digger, 1861. Attributed to Emma Meluish. Collection of Toitū Otago Settlers Museum, Melish folio

William Meluish (c. 1823 – 28 November 1888) was a New Zealand photographer and businessman from Bath, Somerset.

He and his wife Emma opened and ran Meluish's Portrait Gallery in Princes Street, Dunedin from 1860 until 1864

He died at home at his residence 3 Gipsy Hill, Upper Norwood, London, aged 65.
