= 1896 New Zealand census =

Twelfth census of the Colony of New Zealand
- 12 April 1896; 130 years ago

General information
- Country: New Zealand

Results
- Total population: 743,214 (▲12.24 %)
- Most populous provincial district: Otago (163,944)
- Least populous provincial district: Marlborough (12,483)

The 1896 New Zealand census was a census of the non-Māori population taken on 12 April 1896, and a separate census of Māori taken in February 1896. The population (excluding Māori but including Chinese and "half-castes" living as Europeans) was 703,360, a 12.24% increase since the previous census in 1891. The Māori population was estimated to be 39,854, which included 3,503 part-Māori living in tribes and 20 Moriori at the Chatham Islands. Another 2,259 part-Māori were living as Europeans and counted in the main census. The total population of New Zealand was 743,214.

== The process ==
In 1895 the government considered holding censuses every 10 years instead of every five years. The next British census was due in 1901 and it was proposed that New Zealand cancel the upcoming 1896 census and instead take one in 1901, to fall into line with British census-taking. Members of Parliament debated the issue, concerned that population changes required changes in electoral boundaries. MP Alfred Newman stated that the population in the North Island had increased much more than that of the South Island, especially in Auckland due to a mining boom. He said that the South Island could end up with more representation than its population warranted. It was also argued that New Zealand's population was shifting and changing much more rapidly than the population in the United Kingdom. A bill to postpone the census was defeated, and it went ahead on 12 April 1896.

To carry out the census, New Zealand was divided into 33 enumerators' districts. The enumerators divided their districts into subdistricts, each with a sub-enumerator to distribute and collect household schedules. There were about 750 sub-enumerators in total. Each sub-enumerator was given a map of his district, marked into small blocks. The European population recorded in each block would help define electoral districts for the next general election.

Information collected about individuals included name, sex, age, marital status, birthplace, religion, occupation, education, whether British subject or alien, and state of health. Information about the size and construction materials of dwellings was collected, along with information relating to industries, places of worship, institutions and land use. The questions on the census form had been approved at a conference of statisticians in Hobart, Australia in 1890. Collection of information did not always go smoothly. The enumerator at Waipawa threatened to fine businesspeople in the counties of Waipawa and Pahiatua £20 for neglecting to send in their returns.

Once the completed schedules were returned, they were sorted with a card system. Printed cards were marked with the details of each person in the census; the cards could then be sorted by hand in various combinations according to the information required. The Hollerith electrical machine for punching, sorting and counting cards that was in use in the United States of America had been deemed unsuitable for countries like New Zealand with small populations.

The completed census for both Māori and non-Māori was submitted to Parliament on 26 April 1897.

== Non-Māori population ==
Provincial District	Population	Percent (%) change since 1891	Largest borough in each district	Borough population	Borough and suburbs population
Auckland	153,564	15.32 %	Auckland	31,424	57,616
Taranaki	31,175	41.29 %	New Plymouth	3,825	
Hawke's Bay	34,038	19.41 %	Napier	9,231	
Wellington	121,854	24.69 %	Wellington	37,441	41,758
Marlborough	12,483	−2.22 %	Blenheim	3,018	
Nelson	35,734	2.77 %	Nelson	6,659	
Westland	14,469	−8.93 %	Greymouth	3,099	
Canterbury	135,858	5.82 %	Christchurch	16,964	51,330
Otago	163,944	7.09 %	Dunedin	22,815	47,280
Chatham Islands	234	−13.65 %			
Kermadec Islands	7	−63.16 %			
Total	703,360	12.24 %			

== Birthplaces of the non-Māori population ==
Almost two thirds (62.85%) of the non-Māori population was born in New Zealand. Westland had the most foreign subjects (6.11%), and Marlborough had the fewest (0.59%). 'British allegiance' included everyone born in British possessions, naturalised British subjects and British subjects born abroad. Those who were born at sea or who had not specified a birthplace were deemed British if they had a British-sounding name.

There were 3,719 people born in China, of whom only 24 were female. This was a decrease of 16.8 % from the 4,470 Chinese-born people counted in 1891. Most Chinese (1,769) lived in Otago, with smaller communities in Nelson (721), Wellington (474), Westland (370), Auckland (192) and Canterbury (105).

Half of the Scottish-born population lived in Otago. Most Scandinavians (from Denmark, Sweden and Norway) lived in Wellington Province (1622), with other communities in Hawke's Bay (932), Auckland (751), Otago (555) and Canterbury (428).

Birthplace	Number	Percent (%) of population
British possessions:		97.1
New Zealand	441,661	62.85
Australia, Tasmania, Fiji	21,782	3.1
England	116,541	16.58
Wales	2,148	0.31
Scotland	50,435	7.18
Ireland	46,037	6.55
Other British Possessions	3,750	0.53
Foreign countries:		
Austria-Hungary	881	0.13
Belgium	138	0.02
Denmark and Possessions	2,125	0.3
France and Possessions	698	0.1
Germany	4,595	0.65
Greece	127	0.02
Italy	423	0.06
Netherlands and Possessions	132	0.02
Poland	101	0.01
Portugal and Possessions	173	0.02
Russia and Possessions	365	0.05
Spain and Possessions	88	0.01
Sweden and Norway	2,775	0.4
Switzerland	342	0.05
Other European Countries	30	0
China	3,719	0.53
Africa (various)	134	0.02
America, North America	969	0.14
United States of America	780	0.11
Other Foreign Countries	485	0.07
At Sea	1,322	0.19
Birthplace not stated	604	
Total	703,360	100
Allegiance:		
British subjects	690,003	98.1
Foreign subjects	13,357	1.9
Total	703,360	100

== Occupations ==
The non-Māori census asked what occupations the population followed. 31 % of the male population over 10 years old was engaged in farm work (order 21 in the following table). The most common occupations for women were domestic roles (order 3) and dressmaking and millinery (order 15). Only 987 girls aged between 5 and 15 years old were in paid domestic employment, a sharp drop from the previous census in 1891 which showed 1,402 girls doing such work. Some unusual occupations recorded in the census include an ostrich farmer, a zymologist, 11 medical galvanists and 14 phrenologists.

Just over 58% of the population was described as "dependents". This category included wives and widows without an occupation; children at home or in orphanages or industrial schools; parents depending on adult children; patients in hospitals and asylums; and prisoners.

Class	Order	Occupations	Males	Females	Total
I. Professional	1	Persons engaged in government (not otherwise classed) and in defence, law, and protection	3,538	43	3,581
I. Professional	2	Persons ministering to religion, charity, health, education, art, science, and amusements	8,461	7,204	15,665
II. Domestic	3	Persons engaged in the supply of board and lodging, and in rendering personal service for which remuneration is usually paid	5,880	22,930	28,810
III. Commercial (dealers, not manufacturers)	4	Persons performing offices in connection with the exchange, valuation, insurance, lease, loan, or custody of money or real property	4,031	429	4,460
III. Commercial (dealers, not manufacturers)	5	Persons dealing in art and mechanic productions in which matters of various kinds are employed in combination	1,591	189	1,780
III. Commercial (dealers, not manufacturers)	6	Persons dealing in textile fabrics, dress, and fibrous articles	3,308	854	4,162
III. Commercial (dealers, not manufacturers)	7	Persons dealing in food, drinks, narcotics, and stimulants	7,497	684	8,181
III. Commercial (dealers, not manufacturers)	8	Persons dealing in animals, animal substances, and vegetable substances not used for food	1,700	11	1,711
III. Commercial (dealers, not manufacturers)	9	Persons dealing in minerals and other materials mainly used for fuel and light	504	6	510
III. Commercial (dealers, not manufacturers)	10	Persons dealing in minerals other than for fuel	1,034	26	1,060
III. Commercial (dealers, not manufacturers)	11	Persons engaged as general dealers or in undefined mercantile pursuits	9,069	1,594	10,663
III. Commercial (dealers, not manufacturers)	12	Persons engaged in storage	916	0	916
III. Commercial (dealers, not manufacturers)	13	Persons engaged in the transport of passengers, goods, or communications	16,612	325	16,937
IV. Industrial (including manufacturers of goods)	14	Persons engaged in the manufacture or other processes relating to art and mechanic productions, using materials of various kinds in combination	10,985	487	11,472
IV. Industrial (including manufacturers of goods)	15	Persons engaged in the manufacture of, or in other processes relating to, textile fabrics, dress, or fibrous materials	7,849	12,050	19,899
IV. Industrial (including manufacturers of goods)	16	Persons engaged in the manufacture of, or in other processes relating to, food, drinks, narcotics, and stimulants.	5,446	201	5,647
IV. Industrial (including manufacturers of goods)	17	Persons (not otherwise classed) engaged in manufacturing, or otherwise treating, animal and vegetable substances	4,563	18	4,581
IV. Industrial (including manufacturers of goods)	18	Persons engaged in the alteration, modification, or manufacture, or in other processes relating to minerals, mineral substances, and metals	6,440	17	6,457
IV. Industrial (including manufacturers of goods)	19	Persons engaged in the construction or repair of buildings, railways, roads, docks, earthworks, &c., and in the disposal of dead matter and refuse, or in mechanical operations or in labour the nature of which is undefined	15,483	7	15,490
IV. Industrial (including manufacturers of goods)	20	Industrial workers imperfectly defined	17,805	463	18,268
V. Primary	21	Persons engaged in cultivating land, breeding or rearing, preserving, capturing, or destroying animals, or in obtaining raw products from natural sources	103,016	3,114	106,130
VI. Indefinite	22	Persons whose occupations are imperfectly defined, embracing those deriving incomes from sources which cannot be directly related to any other class	4,134	2,418	6,552
VII. Dependent	23	Persons dependent upon natural guardians	127,211	275,716	402,927
VII. Dependent	24	Persons dependent upon the State or upon public or private support	3,518	2,290	5,808
Occupation not stated			824	869	1,693
		Total population	371,415	331,945	703,360

== Māori census ==
The census of Māori was held during February 1896. Circulars written in Māori were printed to explain the purpose of the census. Enumerators tried to appoint sub-enumerators who were Māori or who had good local knowledge and good relations with local people, and ideally could speak Māori, but there was sometimes difficulty finding suitable men who would do the work for the pay offered and in the face of Māori suspicion or opposition to the census. Enumerators travelled around their districts filling in blank forms with the details of the people in each locality. As enumerators filed their reports with the government, they commented on the living conditions, local epidemics, housing and farming in Māori communities.

The Māori population was calculated to be 39,854 people, almost all living in the North Island. The population included Māori women with European husbands, part-Māori living in Māori communities or tribes, and Moriori. Part-Māori living European-style were included in the main census. The population had decreased slightly from the 41,993 Māori recorded in the previous census in 1891. There were difficulties comparing numbers with the previous census. Population changes since then were partly explained by the mobility of the people, who had moved to work on the gum fields and railway works, or gone travelling to follow Te Kooti or for Land Court sittings. Enumerators commented that there were fewer children than expected, and believed that poor nutrition and bad sanitation had led to the younger generation being less healthy than the older people.

There were also difficulties taking the census. An enumerator in the Upper Waikato area reportedly travelled through two or three hundred miles of his district without enrolling a single person, because Māori refused to provide any information. Many Māori refused to provide their details because they feared it would lead to more taxation. In an area near Rotorua, the enumerator said that Māori in the previous census had given made up names, believing that "if the Government knew that a certain tribe only consisted of a few individuals they would got no concessions whatever. They considered that numbers would carry weight both in the native land court and in other matters". The enumerator used his personal local knowledge to ensure that fictitious names were not recorded this time.

The enumerator at Kihikihi stated that "the work of taking the census has not been by any means an easy task". People in areas ruled by the Māori King Mahuta Tāwhiao said that he had recently taken his own census, and they didn't see why they should provide information about themselves or their stock and crops to the government enumerators.

Māori population 1896 census
Principal tribes in the North Island	
Arawa	2,881
Muaupoko	120
Ngatiawa	1,705
Ngaiterangi	848
Ngatikahungunu	4,672
Ngatimaniapoto	1,263
Ngatimaru	1,202
Ngatiporou	3,041
Ngapuhi	5,859
Ngatiraukawa	1,355
Ngatiruanui	710
Ngatiwhatua	490
Rangitane	252
Rarawa	2,495
Taranaki	615
Urewera	1,421
Waikato	3,614
Whanganui	2,440
Whakatohea	643
Whanau-a-Apunui	747
Unspecified	729
Total Population North Island	37,102
Principal tribes in the South Island	
Ngaitahu	1,345
Ngatiawa	340
Ngatimamoe	369
Ngatikahungunu	31
Ngatiruanui	13
Rangitane	65
Waikato	29
Others^{*}	15
Total Population South Island	2,207
Principal tribe in Stewart Island	
Ngaitahu	117
Total Population Stewart Island	117
Principal tribes in the Chatham Islands	
Ngatiawa	177
Ngaitahu	2
Moriori	20
Total Population Chatham Islands	199
Maori wives living with European husbands	229
Grand Total	39,854
