= Margaret Forbes =

New Zealand innkeeper and land protester

Margaret Forbes (c.1807 – 13 January 1877) was a New Zealand innkeeper and land protester. She was born in Fraserburgh, Aberdeenshire, Scotland on c.1807.
