= Alphonse J. Barrington =

New Zealand gold prospector and explorer

Alphonse John Barrington (c.1832–15 December 1893) was a New Zealand gold prospector and explorer. He was born c.1832.
