= Mary Ann Buxton =

- Born: c. 1795; Stoke Newington, Middlesex, England
- Died: 18 October 1888
- Occupations: Teacher, businesswoman, landowner
- Known for: Combined school and girls’ pension in Thorndon (1841–1878); landowning and educational enterprise in early New Zealand

Mary Ann Buxton (c.1795 – 18 October 1888) was a New Zealand teacher and Businessperson.

== Biography ==
She was born in Stoke Newington, Middlesex, England.

She founded and managed the perhaps most successful and well known combined school for small children and girl's pension in Thorndon, New Zealand between 1841 and 1878. She was additionally a successful landowner and greatly expanded the lands she inherited from her late spouse in 1847.
