= Alice May Palmer =

New Zealand public servant (1886–1977)

Alice May Palmer (6 August 1886 - 26 June 1977) was a New Zealand public servant, union official and equal pay campaigner.

She was born in Gordon, Southland, New Zealand in 1886.
