= Frank Anthony (writer) =

New Zealand seaman, farmer, short-story writer and novelist

Frank Sheldon Anthony (13 December 1891 – 13 January 1927) was a New Zealand seaman, farmer, short-story writer and novelist. He was born in Matawhero, East Coast, New Zealand, on 13 December 1891.
