= Thomas Wing =

Thomas Wing (1810–1888) was a New Zealand master mariner, cartographer, harbourmaster and pilot. He was born in Bradfield, Essex, England in 1810.
