= Abraham Boardman =

Abraham Boardman (1824 – 21 May 1897) was elected Mayor of Auckland in 1896, and took office on 16 December in that year. He, however, resigned shortly afterwards on account of ill-health, and died on 21 May 1897, aged seventy-three.

Boardman was born near Bolton, Lancashire, England, and after being headmaster in an important church school, and also in mercantile life in Liverpool and London, he emigrated to the colonies, and arrived in Auckland on 24 January 1864.

He obtained a position in the office of the Superintendent of the Province, and was afterwards Curator of Intestate Estates under the General Government. Subsequently, Boardman was connected extensively with mining companies, and was the first general manager of the South British Insurance Company.

Political offices
Preceded by James Job Holland	Mayor of Auckland City; 1896–1897	Succeeded by Peter Dignan
