= Henry John Walter =

Mayor of Dunedin

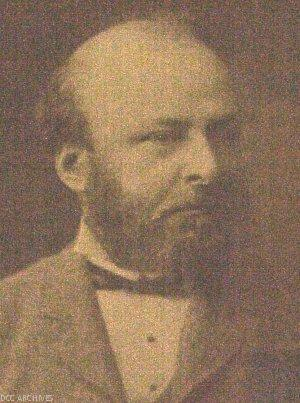

Mayor of Dunedin
- In office 1875-1876; 1878-1880

Personal details
- Born: Jamaica
- Died: 1905
- Occupation: Hotel proprietor

Henry John Walter (died 1905) was a businessman and the Mayor of Dunedin from 1875 to 1876, and 1878 to 1880. Born in Jamaica, Walter arrived in Victoria in 1853, moved to Dunedin in 1864, and became proprietor of the Occidental Hotel on the corner of Manse and High Streets for twenty-nine years.

== Politics ==
Walter was elected to Council in 1869. In the 1870s, he resisted the building of a town hall in the Octagon, but was in office a decade later when the present Municipal Chambers were built. Walter developed a bitter feud with Henry Smith Fish, and after Fish beat him in 1879, challenged Fish's right to hold the contract for painting the municipal building. Fish was then disqualified and Walter was appointed mayor himself.

Due to the bad-feeling this generated in the council, Walter did not receive a mayoral salary for the year. Walter faced bankruptcy proceedings after an iron foundry failed in the 1890s in Dunedin, and then moved to Wellington, where he was the licensee of the Western Hotel. Walter did not prosper in Wellington, and a motion was made to vote him the salary he did not receive during his second term of office. The motion failed, but friends raised funds to support Walter and his wife in Wellington. Walter's widow, Emma, died in her 82nd year in St Andrew's Street Dunedin in 1910.
