= William Parker Street =

New Zealand businessman and Mayor of Dunedin

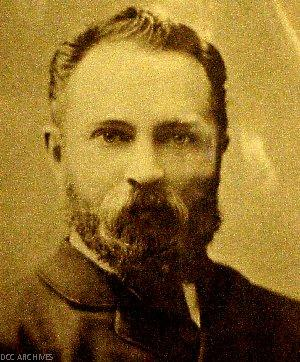
- William Parker Street

Mayor of Dunedin
- In office 1883

Personal details
- Born: 1846; Victoria, New Zealand
- Died: 1899 (aged 52–53); Albany, Western Australia
- Children: 7+

William Parker Street (1846–1899) was a New Zealand businessman and politician who served as Mayor of Dunedin in 1883.

== Biography ==
Street was born in 1846 in Victoria, New Zealand. He moved to Otago in the early 1860s. He was appointed clerk of the Resident Magistrate's Court and Registrar of Births and Deaths for the city. After some years in these positions, he started his own business.

Having served as a city auditor, Street was then elected to the council in 1880. In 1883, Street won the mayoralty by a substantial majority. In December of the same year his eldest son, William Edward, aged 15, was accidentally shot and killed at Saddle Hill. In 1888 Street moved back to Victoria, where he engaged in business until disabled by paralysis in 1896.

Street died in Albany, Western Australia, in 1899, leaving a widow and six children.
