= John Carroll (mayor) =

Irish-New Zealand politician (1836–1903)

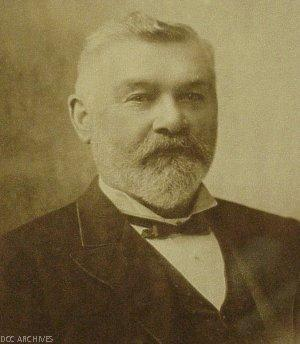
- John Carroll, Mayor of Dunedin

Mayor of Dunedin
- In office 1890

Personal details
- Born: 11 June 1836; Killenaule, Tipperary County, Ireland
- Died: 10 November 1903 (aged 67); New Zealand

John Carroll (11 June 1836 – 10 November 1903) was an Ireland-born New Zealand politician who served as Mayor of Dunedin in 1890.

== Biography ==
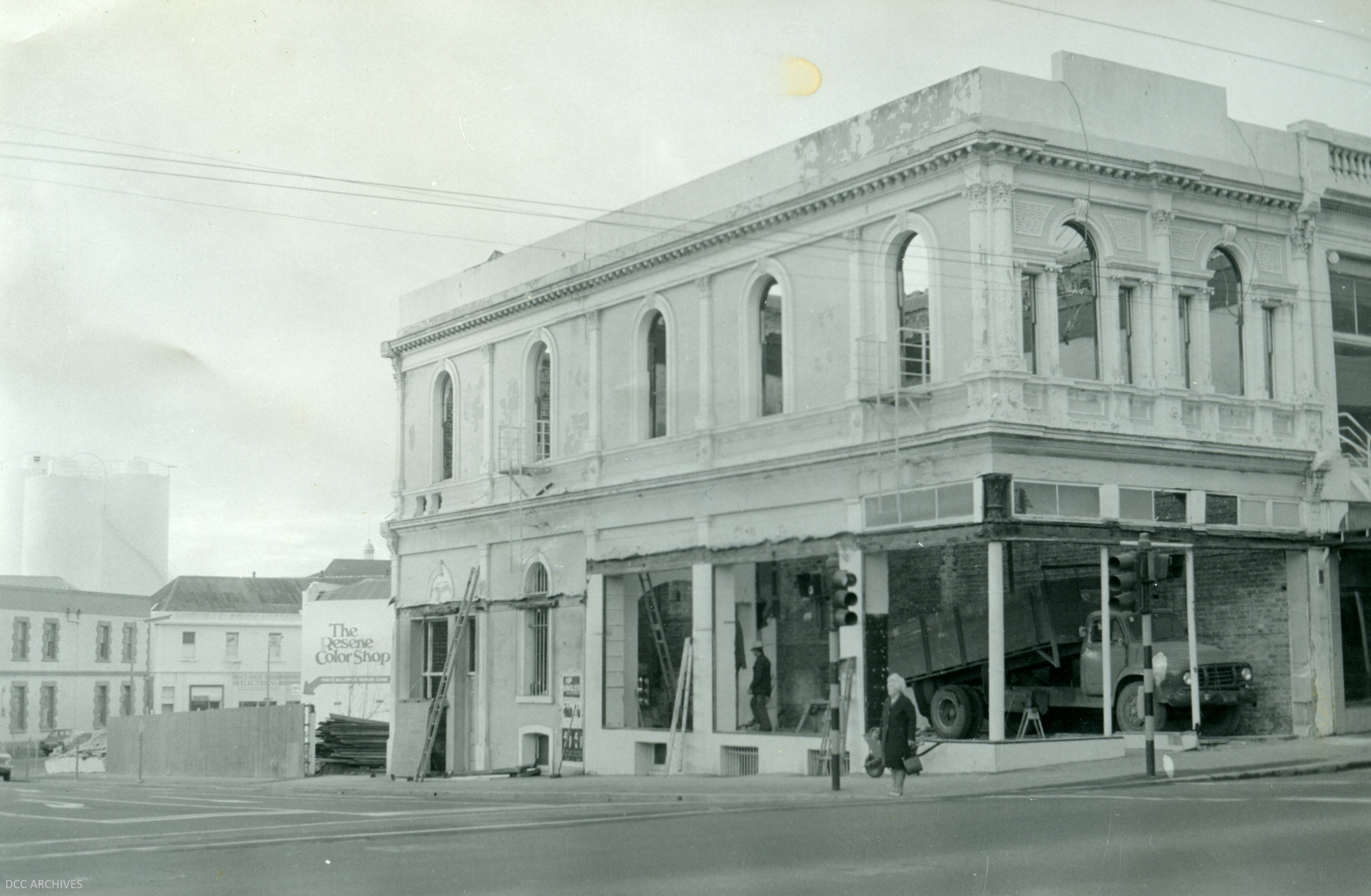
Hibernian Hotel being demolished c. 1972

Carroll was born in Killenaule, Tipperary County, Ireland in 1836. His father was a farmer, but Carroll trained as a stonemason. Carroll emigrated to the Victorian goldfields, and then crossed to Dunedin in 1863. Having some success at the Shotover goldfields, Carroll returned to Dunedin where he met his future wife. He was the host of the Hibernian Hotel, on the corner of what was then called the Octagon (now Moray Place) and George Street, which he rebuilt during his tenure, after a fire. The building was afterwards renamed the European Hotel, and then Carroll's Hotel. The building was demolished circa 1972. Carroll also owned the Douglas Hotel, at 50 The Octagon, which was demolished in 1979 to make way for the Civic Centre.

Carroll was elected to the city council in 1869, and was Dunedin's first Catholic mayor when elected in 1890. He had previously stood for Mayor in 1886, but lost narrowly to Richard Henry Leary. When elected Mayor in 1890, Carroll had the largest majority of any of the 19th century elections. After a brief retirement, Carroll took the European Hotel, before finally retiring and purchasing a property on Walker Street (now Carroll Street). Carroll died in 1903 of presumed heart failure after suffering from 'spasmodic asthma', and was survived by his widow and four sons.
