= Grand Lodge of New Zealand =

Freemasonry in New Zealand

Grand Lodge of Ancient, Free & Accepted Masons of New Zealand
- Established: 1890
- Location: New Zealand
- Region served: New Zealand
- Website: freemasonsnz.org

The Grand Lodge of New Zealand (NZGL) is the governing body for the freemasons within New Zealand under that constitution. Its full name is "The Grand Lodge of Antient, Free and Accepted Masons of New Zealand". The Grand Lodge of New Zealand was constituted on 30 April 1890, however Freemasonry operated in New Zealand since at least 1837 under the older English, Irish, and Scottish constitutions.

== Early history ==
In 1890 there were approximately 151 lodges under the various constitutions and upon constituting the Grand Lodge of New Zealand, 65 lodges joined.

The New Zealand Grand Lodge was constituted on 30 April in 1890 in the St. Augustine Hall located in Christchurch. Official positions occupied for the evening were as follows:

- Grandmaster, R.W. Brother K. T. Gillon, Wellington;
- D.G.M., Brother Vincent Pyke, Dunedin;
- Senior Warden, Brother Dekenzi, Dunedin;
- Junior Warden, Brother Hamilton, Wellington;
- Senior Deacon, Brother Walkley, Palmerston;
- Junior Deacon, Brother Symoris, Auckland;
- Grand Treasurer. Brother Kirton, Feilding;
- Secretary, Brother A. W. Robertson, Wellington;
- Pursuivant, Brother Lindsay, Wellington;
- Grand Sword bearer, Brother George Fisher, Wellington.

The following officers were elected for the first Grand Lodge:

- Grand Master, Brother Henry Thomson, Canterbury;
- Deputy Grand Master, A. S. Russell, Auckland;
- Senior Grand Warden, Henry Feldwick, M.H.R., Invercargill;
- Junior Grand Warden, Douglas Hastings Macarthur, M.H.R., Feilding;
- Grand Treasurer, A. Kaye, Christchurch;
- Grand Registrar, John Joyce, M.H.R., Christchurch;
- Grand Secretary, Rev. W. Ronaldson, Dunedin;
- Grand Chaplain, Rev. W. E. Paige, Masterton;
- President of Board of General Purposes, C. A. C. Hardey, Rakaia;
- President of the Board of Benevolence, A. K. Kirk, Christchurch;
- Senior Grand Deacon, L. Borr, Nelson;
- Junior Grand Deacon, R. Price, Napier;
- Superintendent of Works, J. E. McElvie, Dunedin;
- Director of Ceremonies, H. J. Williams, Wellington;
- Biblebearer, G. C. Fownes, Wellington;
- Pursuivant, A. Kidd, Auckland;
- Organist, A. J. Booth, Dunedin;
- Swordbearer, W. W. Decastro, Blenheim;
- Tyler, C. E. Triggs, Christchurch;
- Assistant Standardbearer, W. Craig, Auckland;
- Assistant Swordbearer, J. Page, Aucklaud;
- Assistant Registrar, J. JL Hawkins, Palmerston North;
- Assistant Director of Ceremonies, T. F. Dodd, Balclutha;
- Assistant Secretary, W. H. Cooper, Auckland;
- Grand Stewards:
  - C. Gilbertson, Invercargill;
  - G. Edgecombe, Hamilton;
  - H. Capten, Hawera;
  - M. Grace, Carterton;
  - T. Carr, Wellington;
  - F. J. Dawes, Petone;
  - F. E. Bridge, Reefton;
  - J. A.. Kirby, Dunedin;
  - Royers, Kumara;
  - R. Dree, Gore;
  - C. Hull, Christchurch;
  - J. Grubb, Lyttelton;
  - T. Bland, Brunnerton;
  - Shearing, Tapanui;
  - Walkley, Palmerston North;
  - Crump, Palmerston South;
  - Bray, Feilding;
  - Dalrymple, Masterton;
  - King, Coromandel;
  - Hugh Valentine, M.H.R., Gore;
- Superintendents of districts
  - Auckland: Malcolm Niccol;
  - Wellington: not filled;
  - Otago: Alfred Henry Burton, Dunedin;
  - Southland: William Horatio Hall, Invercargill
