= George Yerex =

George Franklyn Yerex (1893–1967) was a New Zealand soldier and wildlife ranger. He was born in Wellington, Wellington, New Zealand on 30 January 1893, and died in Te Awamutu on 17 January 1967.
