= Charles Robert Chapman =

Mayor of Dunedin, New Zealand (1847–1928)

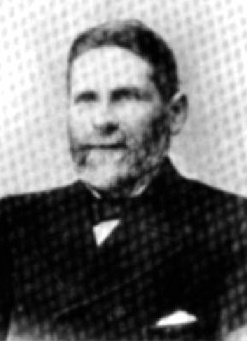
Charles Robert Chapman

Charles Robert Chapman (1847 – August 1928) was Mayor of Dunedin in 1891.

Chapman was born in Edinburgh in 1847. His parents sailed soon after in the Blundell to Port Chalmers. Chapman's father was the Registrar of the Supreme Court, and Clerk to the Provincial Council. Chapman was one of the first to attend Otago Boys High School, before becoming articled to the law, and established his own practice in 1873.

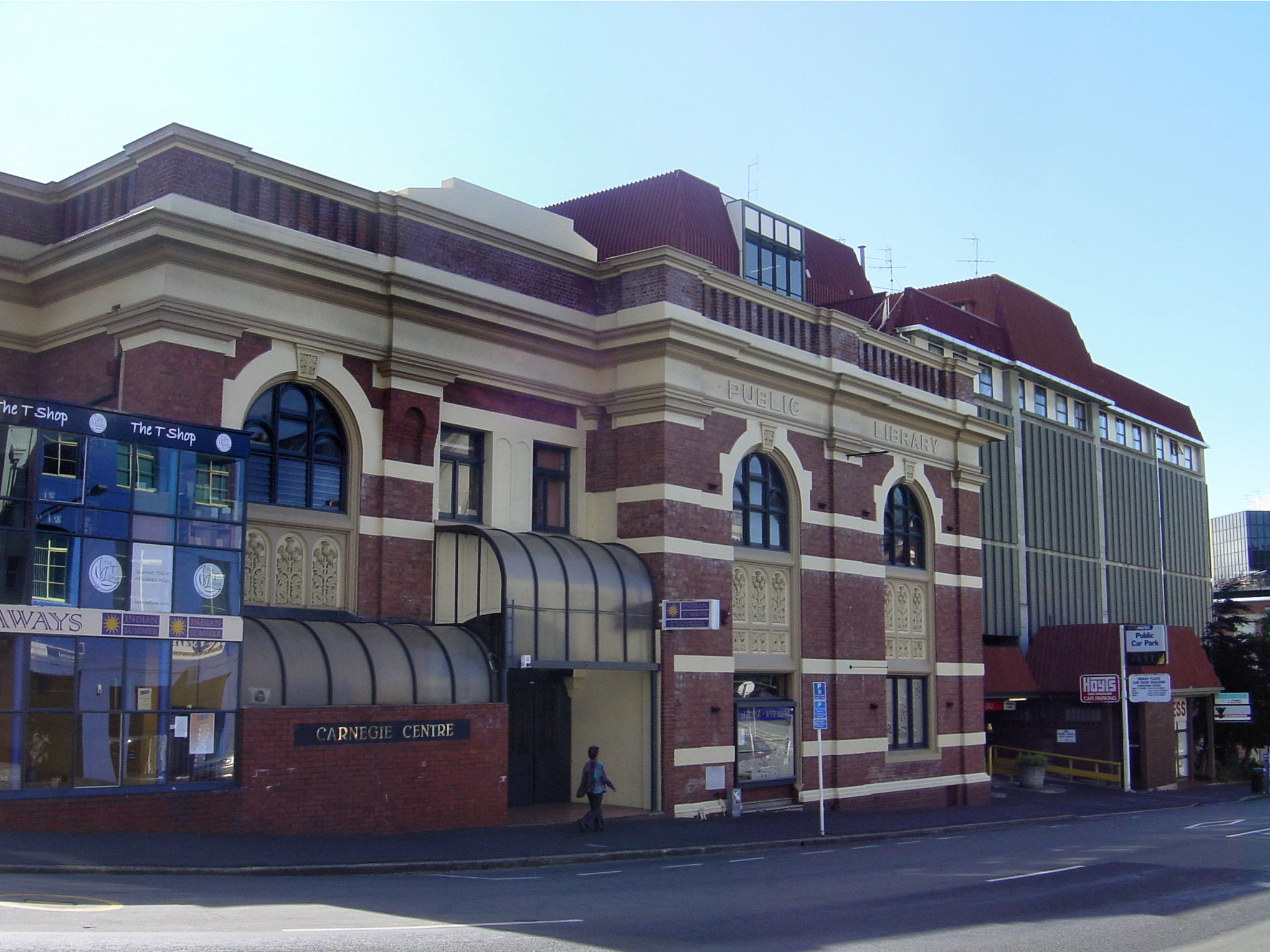
Charles Chapman brought about the establishment of Dunedin's first public library, now the Carnegie Centre. (Photo by Robert Cutts)

Chapman ran for the mayoralty in 1888, but was defeated by Hugh Gourley. In 1890, Chapman was elected to the Town Council as the member for Bell Ward.

Chapman's father built a terrace of townhouses in Stuart Street in 1881, and donated £1,000 towards a towering memorial to the Reverend Thomas Burns in the Octagon, on which it was said the name of the donor was even more prominent than the name of Burns himself. Although the monument was not completed until 1892, it still made Chapman's election as mayor in 1891 somewhat controversial.

Chapman was instrumental in the establishment of Dunedin's first free public library, achieved by writing to Andrew Carnegie in 1901. The library opened in 1908, at 110 Moray Place.

Chapman died at Auckland, August 1928.
