= Jessie Hetherington =

Headmistress, lecturer, school inspector

Jessie Isabel Hetherington (2 January 1882 – 28 February 1971) was a New Zealand headmistress, lecturer and school inspector. She was born in Thames, Thames/Coromandel, New Zealand on 2 January 1882.

Hetherington was the first New Zealand woman graduate to teach at an English secondary school, which she did 1913–14, and was also the first woman secondary school Inspector in New Zealand, a role she filled from 1926 to 1942.
