= Cynisca (horse) =

New Zealand-bred Thoroughbred racehorse

- Sire: Apremont
- Grandsire: Mortemer
- Dam: Nautilus
- Damsire: Traducer
- Sex: Mare
- Foaled: 1886
- Country: New Zealand
- Colour: Not found
- Breeder: Not found
- Owner: Sir George Clifford; George Hunter
- Trainer: Not found
- Record: Not found
- Earnings: Not found

Major wins
- CJC Welcome Stakes (1888); CJC Oaks Stakes (1889); Dunedin Champagne Stakes (1889); Wellington Cup (1890, 1891, 1892); Hawkes Bay Cup (1891); WRC Autumn Handicap (1892); CJC Metropolitan Trophy (1892); Easter Handicap (1892)

Cynisca (foaled 1886 in New Zealand) was a Thoroughbred mare racehorse named for the Spartan princess Cynisca who became the first woman in history to win at the ancient Olympic Games when she won the four-horse chariot race in 396 BC.

The New Zealand mare is best remembered for winning three consecutive Wellington Cups. She was owned by Sir George Clifford and George Hunter.

== See also ==
- Repeat winners of horse races
