= Albert Devore =

Mayor of Auckland (1886–1889)

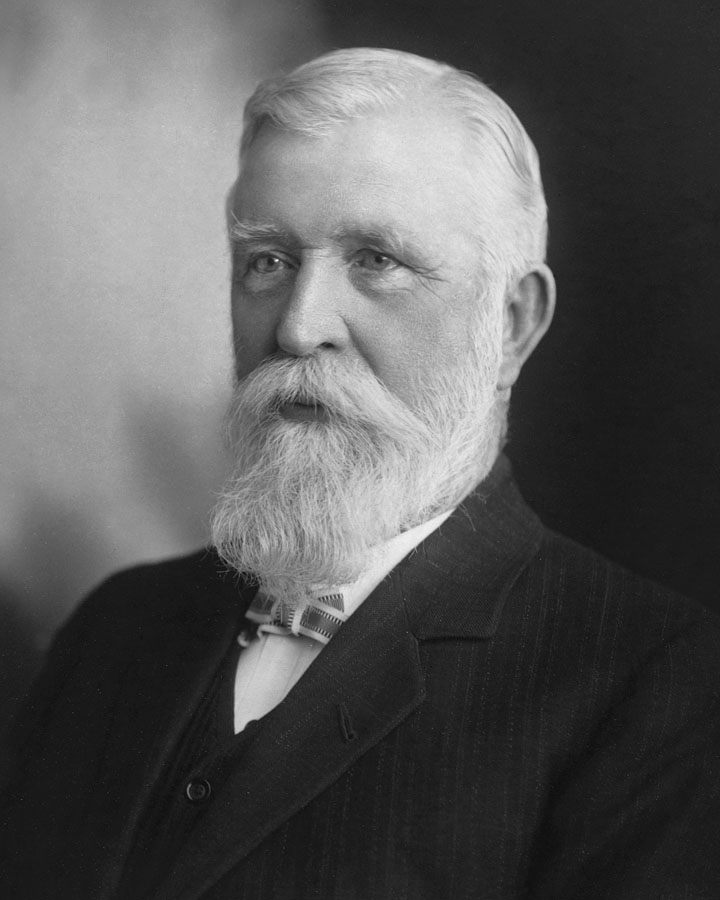

10th Mayor of Auckland City
- In office 1886–1889
- Preceded by: William Waddel
- Succeeded by: John Upton

Personal details
- Born: 1843 Devizes, Wiltshire
- Died: 1916 (aged 72–73)
- Party: Independent

Albert Edward Tyrrell Devore (1843 – 4 February 1916) was a New Zealand barrister and solicitor who served as mayor of Auckland City from 1886 till 1889.

Devore was born in Devizes, Wiltshire, in 1843. He was educated at Marlborough College. In 1859, he arrived in Melbourne and studied law and was admitted to practise in 1871. He came to Dunedin in 1862 and later moved to Auckland. He entered into a partnership with John Benjamin Russell and was later associated with Theophilus Cooper.

From 1882 till 1886, he served as a member of the Auckland City Council and served as mayor from 1886 till 1889. During his term, he officially opened the Auckland Art Gallery. After his term, he served as a member of the harbour board, chairman of the Ponsonby School committee and trustee of the Auckland Savings Bank.

Devore died on 4 February 1916 at his residence in Parnell.

Political offices
Preceded by William Wadde	Mayor of Auckland City; 1886–1889	Succeeded by John Upton (mayor)
