= Leonard Cuff =

New Zealand sportsman

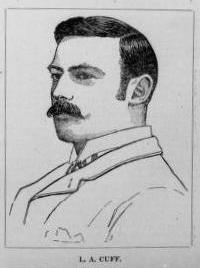
- Drawing of Leonard Cuff in 1890

Personal information
- Full name: Leonard Albert Cuff
- Born: 28 March 1866; Christchurch, New Zealand
- Died: 9 October 1954 (aged 88); Launceston, Tasmania, Australia
- Relatives: Charles Cuff (cousin)

Domestic team information
- Years: Team
- 1886/87–1895/96: Canterbury
- 1896/97: Auckland
- 1903/04–1904/05: Tasmania

Career statistics
Competition	First-class
Matches	24
Runs scored	964
Batting average	22.95
100s/50s	1/5
Top score	176
Balls bowled	1,206
Wickets	29
Bowling average	14.86
5 wickets in innings	0
10 wickets in match	0
Best bowling	4/14
Catches/stumpings	17/–
- Source: CricketArchive, 17 September 2014

Leonard Albert Cuff (28 March 1866 – 9 October 1954) was a sportsman and sports administrator from New Zealand. Born in Christchurch, Cuff was an all-round sportsman who excelled at both athletics and cricket, his most significant sporting association is as the 12th (of 13) Founding Members of the International Olympic Committee, He was appointed to represent New Zealand and Australia from 1894 to 1905. Cuff is credited with instigating the first athletics competitions between Australia and New Zealand, and inter-provincial competitions within New Zealand. He managed New Zealand's first tour of an international athletics team. He was inducted into the New Zealand Sports Hall of Fame in 1995.

== Biography ==
Cuff captained the first New Zealand national cricket team. At the first-class level, he played for both Auckland and Canterbury and later for Tasmania. He also played rugby for Canterbury.

In athletics, Cuff won the New Zealand long jump title three times (1889, 1896 and 1897). In 1887, he was a founder and first Honorary Secretary of the New Zealand Amateur Athletic Association. Cuff managed the five-man team (including himself) that went to England and France in 1892. In Paris, France he won a silver medal for hurdles at an International Athletics Meet. He was also an amateur golfer, winning the Tasmanian Amateur championship in 1904. Cuff died in Tasmania in 1954.

The Leonard Cuff Medal was established in 2000 to award people for their contribution to olympism in New Zealand. John Davies was awarded the medal in 2003, but it has since been discontinued.
