= James Prendergast (judge) =

Attorney-General and Chief Justice of New Zealand (1826–1921)

The Honourable Sir James Prendergast GCMG
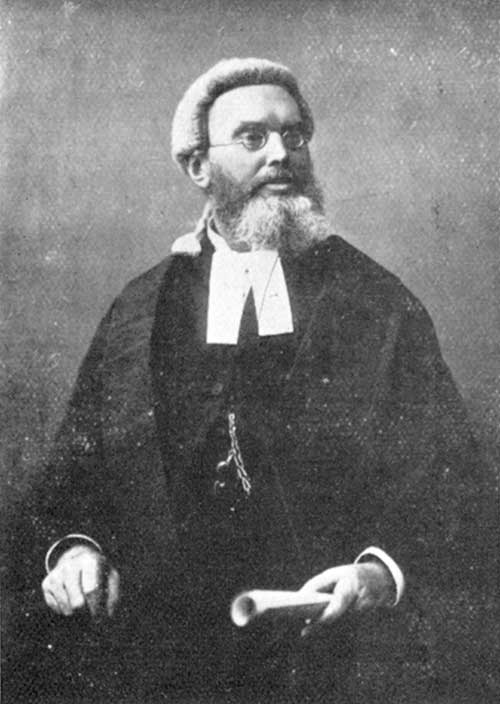

3rd Chief Justice of New Zealand
- In office 1 April 1875 – 25 May 1899
- Nominated by: Daniel Pollen
- Appointed by: Lord Normanby
- Preceded by: George Arney
- Succeeded by: Robert Stout

Personal details
- Born: 10 December 1826 London, England
- Died: 27 February 1921 (aged 94) Wellington, New Zealand
- Spouse: Mary Jane Hall

Sir James Prendergast GCMG (10 December 1826 – 27 February 1921) was the third Chief Justice of New Zealand. Prendergast was the first Chief Justice to be appointed on the advice of a responsible New Zealand government, but is chiefly noted for his far-reaching decision in Wi Parata v The Bishop of Wellington in which he described the Treaty of Waitangi as "a simple nullity".

== Early life ==
Prendergast was born in London, United Kingdom, on 10 December 1826. He was the youngest son of Michael Prendergast QC ( appointed QC 1850) and his wife, Caroline Dawe, the sister of artist George Dawe. Appointed a judge of the Sheriff's Court in London in 1856, his father was controversial but probably eccentric and outspoken rather than corrupt. Other children were Michael (born 1822; came to New Zealand), Philip (born 1824) and Caroline (born 1829, died c. 1840).

He was educated at St Paul's School, London. He entered Caius College, Cambridge in 1845, but soon migrated to Queens' College, graduating BA in 1849. In 1849, he married Mary Jane Hall at Cambridge. They had no children. He enrolled at the Middle Temple in London in 1849, but spent some of the following year teaching at Routledge's School, Bishop's Hull, Somersetshire.

In 1852, he joined the rush to the Eureka diggings in Victoria, Australia. He had some luck as a goldminer but contracted dysentery and moved back to town where he became a magistrate's clerk, first at Elephant Bridge, then Carisbrook and, in 1854, Maryborough. In 1856, another Londoner, the young Julius Vogel, set up shop next to Prendergast's office on the Dunolly field, near Maryborough. Vogel and Prendergast began what was to be a long and mutually beneficial association. His brother Michael Prendergast was also in Victoria, and moved to Dunedin.

Prendergast decided to emigrate to New Zealand and with his wife arrived in Dunedin on 20 November 1862. He was admitted to the Bar in Otago that year. His arrival in Dunedin coincided with the Otago gold rush. Thirty-three lawyers were enrolled in Dunedin in 1862, and twenty more over the next three years. Prendergast's first client was Julius Vogel, then editor of the Otago Daily Times.

In Dunedin, Prendergast prospered – he became a senior partner in the firm of Prendergast, Kenyon and Maddock. In 1863, he was appointed acting solicitor for the Otago Province, and in 1865 became Crown Solicitor in Otago.

== National roles ==
From 1865 onwards Prendergast rose through series of national roles, from Member of Parliament, to Attorney-General and then Chief Justice of New Zealand and leading to his being knighted in November 1881.

=== Legislative Council ===
Prendergast, John Parkin Taylor, Arthur Seymour, John Acland, James Crowe Richmond, James Rolland, Henry Miller, Henry Joseph Coote and Alfred Rowland Chetham-Strode were all appointed to the Legislative Council on 8 July 1865. Prendergast resigned from that role on 15 March 1867.

=== Attorney-General ===
On 20 October 1865, he became a non-political Attorney-General of New Zealand for Edward Stafford's government. In 1867 he resigned from the Legislative Council, his role as Crown solicitor in Otago and his law practice and moved north to Wellington.

As Attorney-General Prendergast's task was to consolidate the criminal law. In the process he drafted 94 Acts. He also helped to create order in the legal profession – in 1870, the New Zealand Law Society was formed with Prendergast as its first president.

=== Chief Justice of New Zealand ===
Prendergast was appointed Chief Justice of New Zealand on 1 April 1875 on the advice of Sir Julius Vogel's government. As such, he was the first New Zealand appointed Chief Justice.

==== Wi Parata v Bishop of Wellington ====
Prendergast's most notable judgement was Wi Parata v the Bishop of Wellington in 1877, a case involving Māori land in Porirua that was given to the Anglican Church for the purpose of building a school. The school was never built and Parata asked the land given to the Church be returned to the Ngāti Toa iwi.

In his judgement, Prendergast took the view that "native" or "aboriginal" customary title, not pursuant to a Crown grant, could not be recognised or enforced by the courts, because the Treaty of Waitangi was a "simple nullity". He called Māori "primitive barbarians", and said they were "incapable of performing the duties, and therefore of assuming the rights, of a civilised community". Prendergast's reasoning was both overturned and enhanced in 1941 when Te Heuheu Tukino v Aotea District Māori Land Board was decided, where the Court ruled that the Treaty was seen as valid in terms of the transfer of sovereignty, but as it was not part of New Zealand statute law it was not binding on the Crown.

==== The Barton Affair ====
During the "Barton Affair" of 1876-78 he imprisoned lawyer George Elliott Barton for a month for contempt of court, a ruling that split the Wellington legal profession. He had probably met "little Barton" (who was described as an "exciteable Irishman") on the Victorian goldfields.

==== Attack on Parihaka ====
A number of times, in his capacity as Chief Justice, he acted as Administrator of the Government. One controversial occasion was in 1881, when the Governor of New Zealand Sir Arthur Gordon was on a visit to Fiji, he sanctioned the invasion of the Māori pacifist Te Whiti o Rongomai's village at Parihaka—something the Governor had indicated he was opposed to.

== Retirement ==
Prendergast resigned as Chief Justice on 25 May 1899, after his wife died on 5 March. In his retirement, he became a director of the Wellington Trust, Loan and Investment Company Limited, and the Colonial Mutual Life Assurance Society Limited. In 1901 he planted the Sitka Spruce on Campbell Island, which in February 2017 was recorded to have the 'golden spike' in nuclear testing in the 1950s and 1960s; it has been named as the 'World's loneliest tree'. He was also appointed a director of the Bank of New Zealand in March 1902. He was interested in farming matters and became the first president of the Manawatu and West Coast Agricultural and Pastoral Association. In 1912, Prendergast was granted the use of the title of "Honourable".

Prendergast died in Wellington on 27 February 1921.

Political offices
Preceded by Henry Sewell	Attorney-General; 1865–1876	Succeeded by Frederick Whitaker
Legal offices
Preceded by George Arney	Chief Justice of New Zealand; 1875–1899	Succeeded by Robert Stout
