= Mary Ann =

Mary Ann or Maryann or Mary Anne is a feminine given name, a combination of the names Mary and Anne. It may refer to:

== People ==
=== Mary Ann ===
- Mary Ann Acevedo (born 1987), Puerto Rican singer and songwriter
- Mary Ann Akers, American gossip columnist, and former blogger and reporter
- Mary Ann Aldersey (1797–1868), English-born Christian missionary in China
- Mary Ann Aldham (1858–1940), English militant suffragette
- Mary Ann Almager (born 1968), American former professional boxer
- Mary Ann Angell (1803–1882), American second wife of Brigham Young
- Mary Ann Arras, former name of Maray Ayres, American actress
- Mary Ann Arty (1926–2000), American politician
- Mary Ann Aspinwall Owens (1928–2005), American advocate of thematically collecting postage stamps
- Mary Ann Augustin (born 1954), Malaysian-born Australian food chemist and dairy scientist
- Mary Ann Baxter (1801–1884), Scottish philanthropist
- Mary Ann Beavis (born 1955), Canadian professor emerita of religion
- Mary Ann Bevan (1874–1933), English nurse
- Mary Ann Bibby (c. 1832–1910), New Zealand storekeeper
- Mary Ann Bickerdyke (1817–1901), American hospital administrator during the American Civil War, lawyer, and advocate for veterans
- Mary Ann Booth (1843–1922), American microscopist
- Mary Ann Britland (1847–1886), English serial killer
- Mary Ann Buckles, American video game researcher
- Mary Ann Bugg (1834–1905), Worimi bushranger
- Mary Ann Buxton (c. 1795–1888), English-born New Zealand teacher and businesswoman
- Mary Ann Campana (1913–2009), Italian-born American aviator and businesswoman
- Mary Ann Carson, American former politician
- Mary Ann Caws (born 1933), American author, translator, art historian, and literary critic
- Mary Ann Childers, American media consultant and former newscaster
- Mary Ann Coady Weinand (1959–2007), American psychiatrist
- Mary Ann Colclough (1836–1885), New Zealand feminist and social reformer
- Mary Ann Conklin (c. 1821–1873), American brothel madam
- Mary Ann Cooke (1784–1868), British missionary
- Mary Ann Criddle (1805–1880), English painter
- Mary Ann Croswell (?–1830), English silversmith
- Mary Ann Cunningham (1841–1930), Canadian temperance activist
- Mary Ann Dailey (born 1948), American former politician
- Mary Ann Davenport (1759–1843), British Shakespearean actress
- Mary Ann DeWeese (1913–1993), American sportswear designer
- Mary Ann Doane (born 1952), American professor of film and media
- Mary Ann Dolling Sanders, birth name of Ann Bridge (1889–1974), English author and mountain climber
- Mary Ann DuChai (born 1939), American sprint canoer
- Mary Ann Duff (1794–1857), English tragedienne
- Mary-Ann Dunjwa, South African politician
- Mary Ann Dunwell (born 1954), American politician
- Mary Ann Dyer Goodnight (1839–1926), American cattlewoman and rancher
- Mary Ann Eaverly, American archaeologist, classical scholar, and professor
- Mary-Ann Eisel (born 1946), American former tennis player
- Mary Ann Eliza Agnew (1857–1940), English-born Australian kindergarten teacher and advocate
- Mary Ann Elizabeth Stephansen (1872–1961), Norwegian mathematician and educator
- Mary Ann Esposito (born 1942), American chef, cookbook writer, and television host
- Mary Ann Evans, known by her pen name George Eliot (1819–1880), English author and journalist
- Mary Ann Feldman (1933–2019), American music critic
- Mary Ann Ford, birth name of Talma (1861–1944), English magician
- Mary Ann Ganser, American member of girl group The Shangri-Las
- Mary Ann Gibbon, English long-term mistress of Charles Howard, 11th Duke of Norfolk
- Mary Ann Gilbert (1776–1845), English agronomist
- Mary Ann Glendon (born 1938), American diplomat, professor, legal scholar, anti-abortion activist, lawyer, and philosopher
- Mary Ann Glynn, American academic
- Mary Ann Gomes (born 1989), Indian chess player
- Mary Ann Greaves (1834–1897), New Zealand prostitute and criminal
- Mary Ann Grindall Hume, British wife of Allan Octavian Hume
- Mary Ann Handley (1936–2023), American politician
- Mary Ann Hanmer Dodd (1813–1878), American poet
- Mary Ann Hanusa (born 1963), American politician
- Mary Ann Hanway, English 18th-century travel writer and novelist
- Mary Ann Harbert (born 1945), American former prisoner in China
- Mary Ann Haynie, real name of Mabel Stark (1889–1968), American tiger trainer
- Mary Ann Heacock (1915–2011), American botanist
- Mary Ann Hilliard (1860–1950), Irish nurse and suffragette
- Mary Ann Hitchens (born 1944/1945), American former sports coach and administrator
- Mary Ann Hoberman (1930–2023), American children's writer
- Mary Ann Holzkamp, American mayor
- Mary Ann Horton (born 1955), American Usenet- and Internet pioneer
- Mary Ann Jordan (?–1966), American murder victim
- Mary Ann Kelty (1789–1873), British religious writer
- Mary Ann Kerwin (born 1931), American lawyer and breastfeeding activist
- Mary Ann Kiliwehi Kaʻauwai (c. 1840–1873), Hawaiian high chiefess and lady-in-waiting of Hawaii
- Mary Ann Kilner (1753–1831), English writer of children's books
- Mary-Ann Kirkby (born 1959), Canadian author
- Mary Ann Knowles (1946–2017), American politician
- Mary Ann Lake Wallis (1821–1910), English-born New Zealand orphanage matron
- Mary Ann Lawrenson (1850–1943), English activist in the co-operative movement, and educationalist
- Mary Ann Lee (1824–1899), American ballerina
- Mary Ann Leeper, American lecturer
- Mary-Ann Leneghan (1989–2005), English murder victim
- Mary Ann Liebert, American founder of Mary Ann Liebert, Inc.
- Mary Ann Lila, American researcher and health activist
- Mary Ann Lippitt (1918–2006), American pilot and philanthropist
- Mary Ann Lipscomb (1848–1918), American educator
- Mary Ann Lisanti (born 1967), American politician
- Mary Ann Lyth (1811–1890), British missionary, translator, and teacher
- Mary Ann MacKenzie (1925–1997), American politician
- Mary Ann Magnin (1850–1943), Dutch-American businesswoman and co-founder of I. Magnin
- Mary Ann Maitland (1839–1919), Scottish-born Canadian author of poems, hymns, and short stories
- Mary Ann Mansigh (born 1932), American computer programmer
- Mary Ann Mantell (1795–1869), English fossil collector
- Mary Ann McGrath (born 1953), Canadian politician
- Mary Ann McHard (1825–1912), Western Australian pioneering botanist
- Mary Ann M'Clintock (1800–1884), American abolitionist and suffragist
- Mary Ann McMorrow (1930–2013), American Supreme Court chief justice
- Mary Ann Mendoza, American mother of fallen police officer Brandon Mendoza
- Mary Ann Mobley (1937–2014), American actress, television personality, and Miss America 1959
- Mary Ann Muir (1881–1962), New Zealand nurse who served in World War I
- Mary Ann Müller (1820–1901), English-born New Zealand writer and suffragist
- Mary Ann Nagel (born 1955), German singer
- Mary Ann Neeley (1932–2018), American author and historian
- Mary Ann Nevins Radzinowicz (1925–2023), American academic and scholar of English literature
- Mary Ann Nichols (1845–1888), English victim of Jack the Ripper
- Mary Ann Niles (1923–1987), American wife of Bob Fosse
- Mary Ann Nyberg (1923–1979), American costume designer
- Mary Ann Oatman (1843–c. 1855), American victim of the Oatman Massacre
- Mary Ann O'Brian Malkin (1913–2005), American editor and dance notator
- Mary-Ann Ochota (born 1981), British broadcaster and anthropologist
- Mary Ann Ogden Avery (1825–1911), American art collector and museum benefactor
- Mary Ann Orger (1788–1849), English actress and playwright
- Mary Ann Pascal (born 1958), American actress and business executive
- Mary Ann Paton (1802–1864), Scottish vocalist
- Mary Ann Perez (born 1962), American politician
- Mary Ann Pollar (1927–1999), American concert promoter-, organizer-, and administrator
- Mary Ann Prout (1800/1801–1884), African-American founder, businesswoman, and teacher
- Mary Ann Redmond (born 1959), American singer
- Mary Ann Rocque (c. 1725–1774), English cartographer
- Mary Ann Rundall (?–1839), English educational writer
- Mary Ann Sainsbury (1849–1927), English businesswoman
- Mary Ann Sampson, American artist
- Mary Ann Scherr (1921–2016), American designer, metalsmith, and educator
- Mary Ann Seaton (1905–1974), Northern Irish footballer
- Mary Ann Severne, New Zealand-born Australian actress
- Mary Ann Shadd (1823–1893), American-Canadian anti-slavery activist, journalist, publisher, teacher, and lawyer
- Mary Ann Shaffer (1934–2008), American writer, editor, librarian, and bookshop worker
- Mary Ann Sieghart (born 1961), English author, journalist, radio presenter, and former assistant editor
- Mary Ann Smart (born 1964), Canadian-born musicologist
- Mary Ann Sponsler, American partner of Isaac Singer
- Mary Ann Steggles (born 1949), Canadian art historian, curator, and artist
- Mary Ann Sutherland (1864–1948), New Zealand farmer and landowner
- Mary Ann Swenson (born 1947), American Methodist bishop
- Mary Ann Tighe (born 1948), American commercial real estate broker and CEO
- Mary Ann Tobin, American former politician
- Mary Ann Tocker (1778–1853), English first woman tried for libel and to act as her own advocate in British court
- Mary Ann Tripp (1810–1906), American first U.S. woman to visit China and to circumnavigate the Earth
- Mary Ann Turcke, Canadian media executive
- Mary Ann Unger (1945–1998), American sculptor
- Mary Ann Vaughn (born 1949), Swedish woman who was involved in a public, controversial case in international family law
- Mary Ann Vecchio (born 1955), Italian American respiratory therapist
- Mary Ann Venables, British fencer
- Mary Ann Vial Lemmon (born 1941), American senior district judge
- Mary Ann Weathers, American essayist and civil rights activist
- Mary Ann Weitnauer, American electrical engineer and professor
- Mary Ann Whipple-Lue, American former mayor
- Mary Ann Willson (fl. 1810–1825), American folk artist
- Mary Ann Winkowski, American television personality and spiritual medium
- Mary Ann Wolcott Goodrich (1765–1805), American socialite
- Mary Ann Xantippe Saunders (1838–1922), American portrait painter and art teacher
- Mary Ann Yates (1728–1787), English tragic actress

=== Maryann ===
- MaryAnn Baenninger (born 1956), American psychology professor and former university president
- MaryAnn Bin-Sallik (born 1940), Djaru elder and Australian academic
- MaryAnn Black (1943–2020), American clinical social worker and politician
- Maryann Brandon, American film- and television editor
- MaryAnn Carr, American candidate in the 2024 United States House of Representatives elections in New York
- Maryann Corbett, American poet, medievalist, and linguist
- Maryann Ekeada (born 1979), Nigerian judoka
- Maryann Hanson, Venezuelan politician
- MaryAnn Hill, American retired computer scientist
- Maryann Karinch, American author, literary agent, and speaker- and consultant on body language
- Maryann Kelechukwu (born 2003), Nigerian volleyball player
- Maryann Keller (1943–2022), American automotive industry analyst and author
- MaryAnn Lippert (born 1953), American health educator, health administrator, and politician
- Maryann Mahaffey (1925–2006), American politician and activist
- Maryann McConnell, Canadian snooker- and pool player
- MaryAnn Mihychuk (born 1955), Canadian politician
- Maryann Mitchell (1933–2002), American politician
- Maryann Plunkett (born 1952), American actress and singer
- Maryann Simko, birth name of Taisha Abelar, American writer and anthropologist
- MaryAnn Tanedo, American film- and music video producer
- MaryAnn Tierney, American emergency management official

=== Mary Anne ===
- Mary Anne à Beckett (1815–1863), English composer
- Mary Anne Adams (born 1954), American activist
- Mary Anne Ansley (fl. 1810–1840), British artist
- Mary-Anne Arsenault (born 1968), Canadian curler
- Mary Anne Atwood (1817–1910), English writer
- Mary Anne Baikie (1861–1950), Scottish suffragist
- Mary Anne Balsillie, Canadian politician
- Mary Anne Barker (1831–1911), English author
- Mary Anne Barkhouse (born 1961), Canadian jeweler and sculptor
- Mary Anne Bobinski (born 1962), American legal scholar, educational administrator, and dean
- Mary Anne Burges (1763–1813), Scottish writer
- Mary Campion or Mary Anne Campion (1687–1706), English singer, dancer, and mistress of William Cavendish, 1st Duke of Devonshire, or their daughter Mary Anne Cavendish
- Mary Anne Chambers (born 1950), Canadian politician
- Mary Anne Cosgrave (1863–1900), Irish Dominican nun, pioneer nurse in Rhodesia, educationist, and prioress
- Mary Anne Cotterill (born 1945), English butterfly swimmer
- Mary Anne Cust (1799–1882), British naturalist, scientific illustrator, and author
- Mary Anne de Boisblanc (1925–2015), American self-taught artist
- Mary Anne Disraeli (1792–1872), British peeress and society figure
- Mary Anne Ewart (1830–1911), English patron of higher education for women
- Mary Anne Fackelman-Miner (born c. 1947), American photojournalist
- Mary-Anne Fahey (born 1955), Australian actress, comedian, screenwriter, and children's author
- Mary Anne Franks, American legal scholar, author, activist, and media commentator
- Mary Anne Frey (1934–2019), American NASA chief scientist
- MaryAnne Golon (born 1960), American journalist
- Mary Anne Guggenheim (born 1935), American pediatric neurologist, physician, and former politician
- Mary Anne Holford (1829–1901), British novelist and playwright
- Mary Anne Hobbs (born 1964), BBC Radio 6 DJ
- Mary Anne Jablonski (born c. 1952), Canadian politician
- Mary Anne Jevons (1795–1845), English poet
- Mary Anne Keeley (1805–1899), English actress and actor-manager
- Mary-Anne Kenworthy (born 1956), New Zealand-born Western Australian brothel owner and businesswoman
- Mary Anne Krupsak (born 1932), American lawyer and politician
- Mary Anne Lamb (1764–1847), English writer
- Mary Anne Lockwood (1858–1938), Australian temperance worker and suffragist
- Mary Anne Marchino (1938–2021), American competition swimmer
- Mary Anne Mendrez (born 1998), Filipino volleyball player
- Mary Anne Mohanraj (born 1971), Sri Lankan-born American writer, editor, and academic
- Mary-Anne Monckton (born 1994), Australian artistic gymnast
- Mary-Anne Musonda (born 1991), Zimbabwean cricketer
- Mary-Anne Plaatjies van Huffel (1959–2020), South African pastor and academic
- Mary Anne Pocock (1863–1946), Australian nursing sister and army matron
- Mary-Anne Poole, New Zealand association footballer
- Mary Anne Rawson (1801–1887), English abolitionist
- Mary Anne Raywid (1928–2010), American education scholar, author, and activist
- Mary Anne Reiley, real name of Mame Reiley (1952–2014), American political activist and business leader
- Mary Anne Richey (1917–1983), American district judge
- Mary Anne Rymill (c. 1817–1897), New Zealand missionary, teacher, nurse, and companion
- Mary Anne Sadlier (1820–1903), Irish author
- Mary Anne Salmon (born 1939), American politician
- Mary Anne Schimmelpenninck (1778–1856), British writer
- Mary Anne Schwalbe (1934–2009), American university administrator and refugee worker
- Mary Anne Stebbing (1845–1927), British botanist and botanical illustrator
- Mary Anne Stirling (1815–1895), English actress
- Mary Anne Swainson (1833–1897), New Zealand headmistress
- Mary Anne Tauskey (born 1955), American equestrian and Olympic medalist
- Mary Anne Whitby (1783–1850), English writer, landowner, artist, and zoologist
- Mary-Anne Williams, Australian thought leader on innovation, computer scientist, roboticist, and AI researcher
- Mary Anne Wilson (1802–1867), English opera singer

== Music ==
- Mary Ann Acevedo (born 1987), Puerto Rican singer and songwriter
- Mary-Ann, original name of the Finnish gothic metal band To/Die/For
- Mary Ann (album), 2006 debut album of Mary Ann Acevedo

=== Songs ===
- "Mary Ann" (Black Lace song), 1979
- "Mary Ann" (Ray Charles song), 1956
- "Mary Ann", a 1980 song written by Christopher Cross
- "Mary Anne" (song), a 1982 song by Marshall Crenshaw
- "Mary Ann", a 1928 song written by Abner Silver and Benny Davis
- "Mary Ann", a song by Alice Cooper from the 1973 album Billion Dollar Babies
- "Mary Ann", a song by Bob Dylan from the 1973 album Dylan
- "Mary Ann", a circa 1945 calypso attributed to Roaring Lion (Rafael de Leon) later popularized as Marianne (Terry Gilkyson song)
- "Mary Ann", a 1973 song by Vladimir Vysotsky
- "Mary Ann Limbo", a 1963 song written by William H Eaton Jr. and performed by Chubby Checker
- "Mary Anne", a song by Anjan Dutt from the 1995 album Purono Guitar
- "Mary Ann", a 1975 song by Andy Kim
- "Mary Anne", a song by Jerry Lordan, recorded by The Shadows
- "Mary Ann", a song by Regina Spektor from the album 11:11

== Film, television and literature ==
- Mary Anne (novel), a 1954 novel by Daphne du Maurier
- Mary Ann (film), a 1918 Hungarian silent drama film
- Marianne, a female personification of France
- Mary Ann, a 1958 novel by Alex Karmel, later adapted into a screenplay for the 1961 motion picture Something Wild

== Other ==
- Battle of FSB Mary Ann, a Vietnam War battle
- Mary Anne, a caravan of wagons carrying a stove, food, tents, blankets and tools to support a log drive
- Mary Anne, one of four ships hired by the New Zealand Company in 1841
- Mary Ann (1772), whaling and convict ship
- Mary Ann (pilot boat), American 19th-century Sandy Hook pilot boat
- Maryann (yacht), a yacht requisitioned and converted by the United States Navy during the defense of the Philippines in World War II

== Fictional characters ==
- Mary Ann Patterson, in the US TV series Ghost Whisperer, played by June Squibb
- Mary Ann Summers, in the US sitcom Gilligan's Island, played by Dawn Wells
- Mary Anne Reynolds, in the 1987 US novel Mary and the Giant
- Mary Anne Spier, in Ann M. Martin's The Baby-Sitters Club series

== See also ==
- Marianne (disambiguation)
- Marie Anne, given name
- Maryanne, given name
