= Mary Sutherland =

Mary Sutherland may refer to:

- Mary S. Sutherland, American academic and educator; professor of health education at Florida State University
- Mary Ann Sutherland (1864–1948), New Zealand farmer and landowner
- Mary Sutherland (forester) (1893–1955), first professional woman employed by the New Zealand State Forest Service
- Mary Sutherland (political administrator) (1895–1972), Chief Women's Officer of the British Labour Party
- Mary Sutherland Maxwell, birth name of Rúhíyyih Khánum (1910–2000), American-born Canadian Hand of the Cause of the Baháʼí Faith

== See also ==
- Liz Carpenter (1920–2010), born Mary Elizabeth Sutherland, writer, feminist and reporter
