= Croswell =

Croswell can refer to:

== People ==
- Charles Croswell, Michigan governor
- Edwin Croswell, 19th-century journalist
- Harry Croswell, 19th-century journalist and clergyman
- Ken Croswell, astronomer
- Mary Ann Croswell, English silversmith
- Walter J. Croswell, American farmer and politician

== Places ==
- Croswell, Michigan, United States
