= Émile Barbier =

Belgian fencer (born 1901)

Personal information
- Born: 3 November 1901 Etterbeek, Belgium

Sport
- Sport: Fencing

Émile Edmond Gustave Barbier (born 3 December 1901, date of death unknown) was a Belgian fencer. He competed in the team épée event at the 1928 Summer Olympics. Two years later, at the 1930 World Fencing Championships, Barbier won a gold medal.
