= Caroline Reinagle =

English composer, pianist and writer

Caroline Reinagle (born Caroline Orger) (1 May 1817 – 11 March 1892) was an English classical composer, pianist, and writer. Only a few of her works have survived.

== Life ==
Reinagle was born in London on 1 May 1817. Her father was Dr Thomas Orger and her mother was Mary Ann Orger who was a comic actress. In the 1840s she had several of her works published and performed, including a piano trio, premiered by 1842 and a piano concerto, published 1842 and performed by her in 1843 at Hanover Square Rooms. Her mother was well read and her father, Dr Thomas Orger was a translator of Ovid and Anacreon, and he had written a book about Napoleon. He didn't object to her mother's acting and he became a founding member of the Swedenborg Society and the editor of Intellectual Repository. Both her parents became members of the Swedenborgian church.

In 1846 she married Alexander Robert Reinagle (1799-1877), organist at St Peter-in-the-East, Oxford, composer of the hymn tune St Peter, and son of Joseph Reinagle. She died in Tiverton, Devon, in 1892.

== Compositions ==
Her only apparently surviving compositions are some songs, a tarantella in E minor and a sonata in A (the latter two works for piano). The last two have been republished by Vivace Press, and recorded by Hiroaki Takenouchi. Also surviving is a pair of articles in the 1862 Musical Times entitled A Few Words on Piano Playing. Composed but possibly lost also were at least one piano quartet and a cello sonata in addition to the concerto and trio.
