= Hugh Scott (disambiguation) =

Hugh Scott (1900–1994) was an American lawyer and politician.

Hugh Scott may also refer to:

- Hugh B. Scott (born 1949), American judge in New York
- Hugh L. Scott (1853–1934), chief of staff of the United States Army, 1914–1917
  - USS Hugh L. Scott
- Hugh Stowell Scott (died 1903), English novelist
- Hugh Scott (entomologist) (1885–1960), British entomologist and biogeographer
- Hugh Scott of Gala (1822–1877), Scottish soldier
- Hugh Scott (architect) (1875–1930), Belfast-born architect who practised in Africa and Australia
