= Heacock =

Heacock is a surname. Notable people with the surname include:

- Jim Heacock (born 1948), American football player and coach
- Jon Heacock (born 1960), American football player and coach
- Mary Ann Heacock (1915–2011), American botanist
- Raymond Heacock (1928–2016), American aerospace engineer
- Seth G. Heacock (1857–1928), American politician
- Willard J. Heacock (1821–1906), American businessman and politician
