= Mary Cooke (disambiguation) =

Mary Cooke (1841–1916) was a British peace campaigner and Quaker minister.

Mary Cooke may also refer to:

- Mary A. Cooke Thompson (1825–1919), American women's rights activist
- Mary Ann Cooke (1784–1868), British missionary and educator
- Mary-Cooke Branch Munford (1865–1938), American activist for women's rights, civil rights, women's suffrage, and education
- Mary Leggett Cooke (1852–1938), American Unitarian minister
