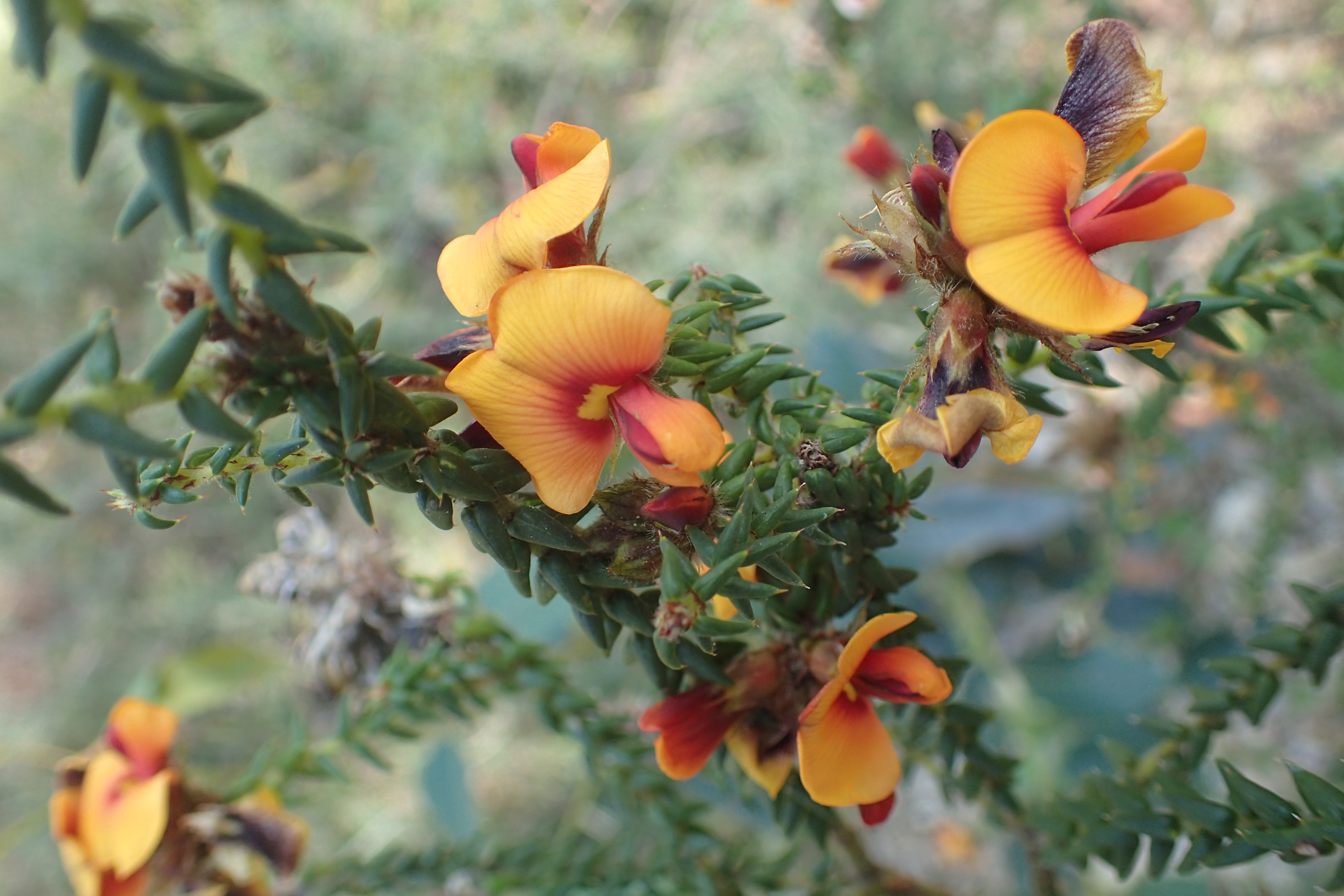

Conservation status
- Priority Four — Rare Taxa (DEC)

Scientific classification
- Kingdom: Plantae
- Clade: Tracheophytes
- Clade: Angiosperms
- Clade: Eudicots
- Clade: Rosids
- Order: Fabales
- Family: Fabaceae
- Subfamily: Faboideae
- Genus: Pultenaea
- Species: P. skinneri

Binomial name
- Pultenaea skinneri F.Muell.

= Pultenaea skinneri =

Skinner's pea

Species of legume

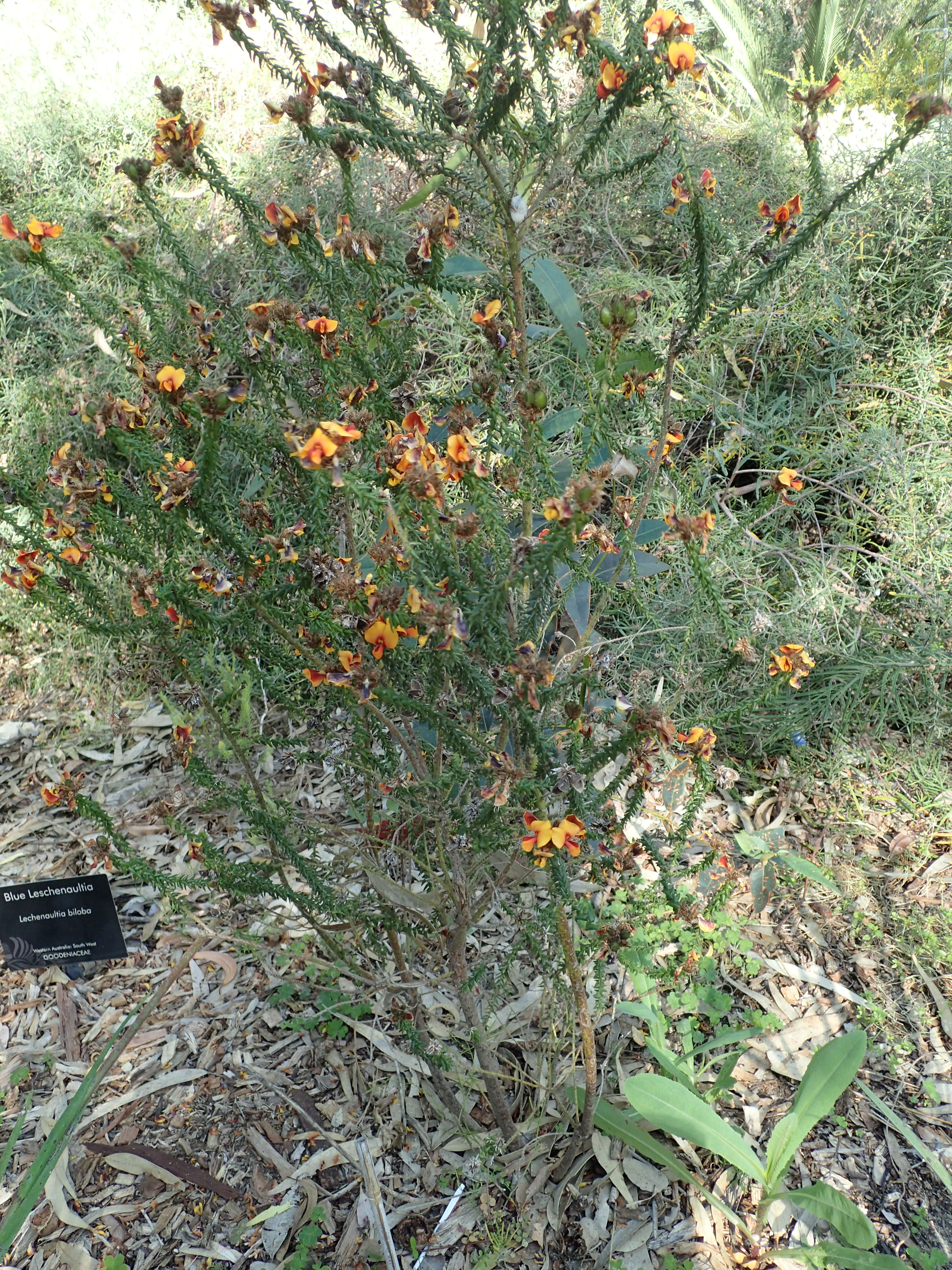
Habit in Kings Park, Perth

Pultenaea skinneri, commonly known as Skinner's pea, is a species of flowering plant in the family Fabaceae and is endemic to the south-west of Western Australia. It is a slender shrub with simple leaves, and yellow, red and orange flowers with red markings.

== Description ==
Pultenaea skinneri is a slender shrub that typically grows to a height of 1–2 m (3 ft 3 in – 6 ft 7 in). The leaves are arranged alternately along the stems, simple, 6.5–10 mm (0.26–0.39 in) long and 1.2–4.2 mm (0.047–0.165 in) wide with stipules 1.7–3.2 mm (0.067–0.126 in) long at the base. Each flower is arranged on a hairy pedicel 2.5–3 mm (0.098–0.118 in) long with bracteoles attached. The sepals are 8–11 mm (0.31–0.43 in) long, the standard petal is yellow or orange with a red base and 17–19 mm (0.67–0.75 in) long, the wings 13–17 mm (0.51–0.67 in) long and the keel 13–16 mm (0.51–0.63 in) long. Flowering occurs from July to September and the fruit is a flattened pod.

== Taxonomy ==
Pultenaea skinneri was first formally described by botanist Ferdinand von Mueller in 1874 in Fragmenta Phytographiae Australiae, from specimens collected by Mary Ann McHard near the Blackwood River in south-western Western Australia. McHard collected over 2,000 specimens, now conserved in the National Herbarium of Victoria. The specific epithet, (skinneri), honours George Skinner, an employee of the Victorian Government Printer, where the Fragmenta was published.

== Distribution and habitat ==
Skinner's pea grows in winter-wet depressions in the Jarrah Forest, Swan Coastal Plain and Warren biogeographic regions in the south-west of Western Australia.

== Conservation status ==
This pea is classified as "Priority Four" by the Government of Western Australia Department of Biodiversity, Conservation and Attractions, meaning that is rare or near threatened.
