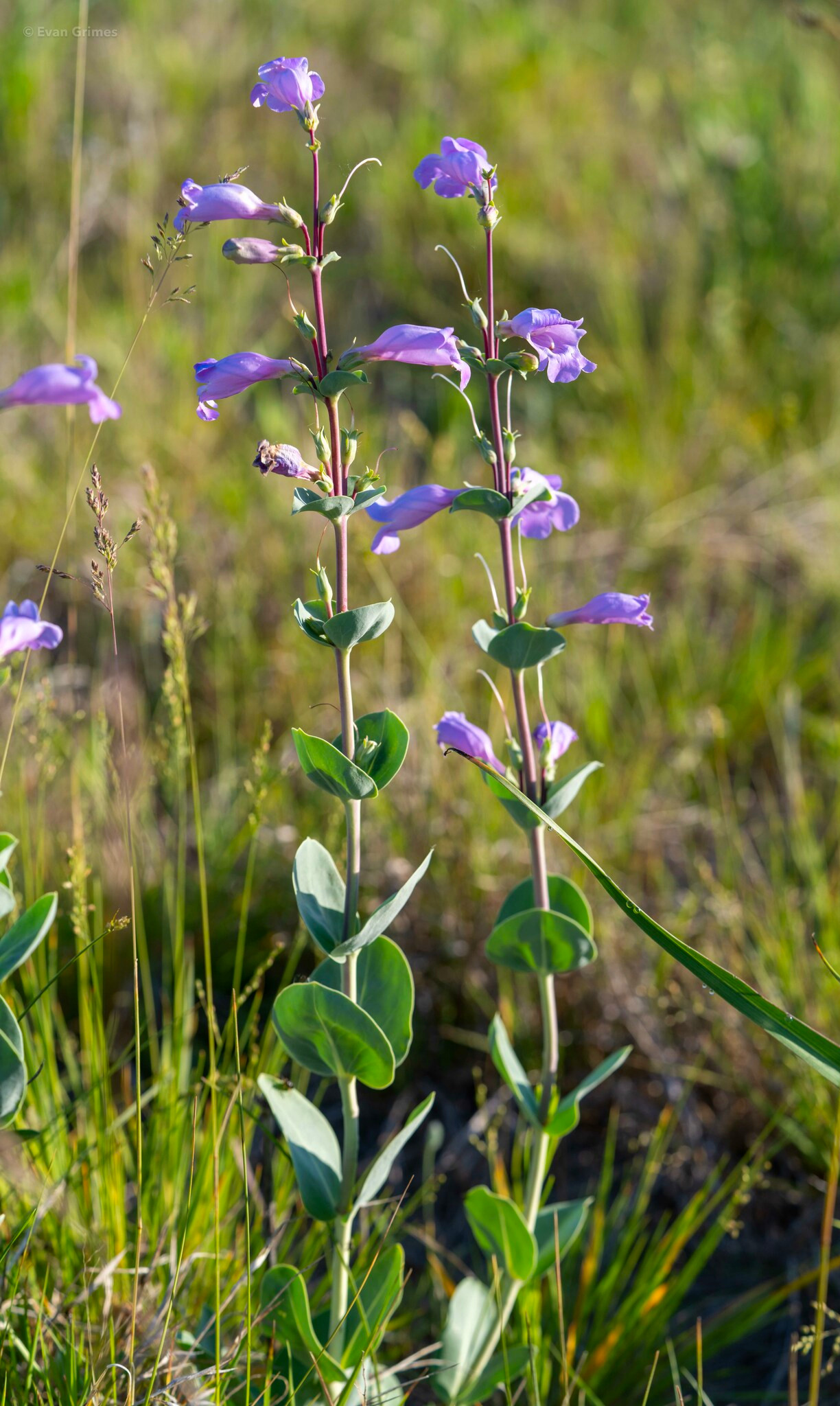

Conservation status
- Secure (NatureServe)

Scientific classification
- Kingdom: Plantae
- Clade: Tracheophytes
- Clade: Angiosperms
- Clade: Eudicots
- Clade: Asterids
- Order: Lamiales
- Family: Plantaginaceae
- Genus: Penstemon
- Species: P. grandiflorus

Binomial name
- Penstemon grandiflorus Nutt.

Synonyms
- Chelone bradburyi (Pursh) Steud.; Chelone grandiflora Spreng.; Penstemon bradburyi Pursh

= Penstemon grandiflorus =

Species of flowering plant in the family Plantaginaceae

Penstemon grandiflorus, known by the common names shell-leaved penstemon, shell-leaf beardtongue, or large-flowered penstemon, is a tall and showy plant in the Penstemon genus from the plains of North America. Due to its large flowers it has found a place in gardens, particularly ones aimed at low water usage like xeriscape gardens.

== Description ==
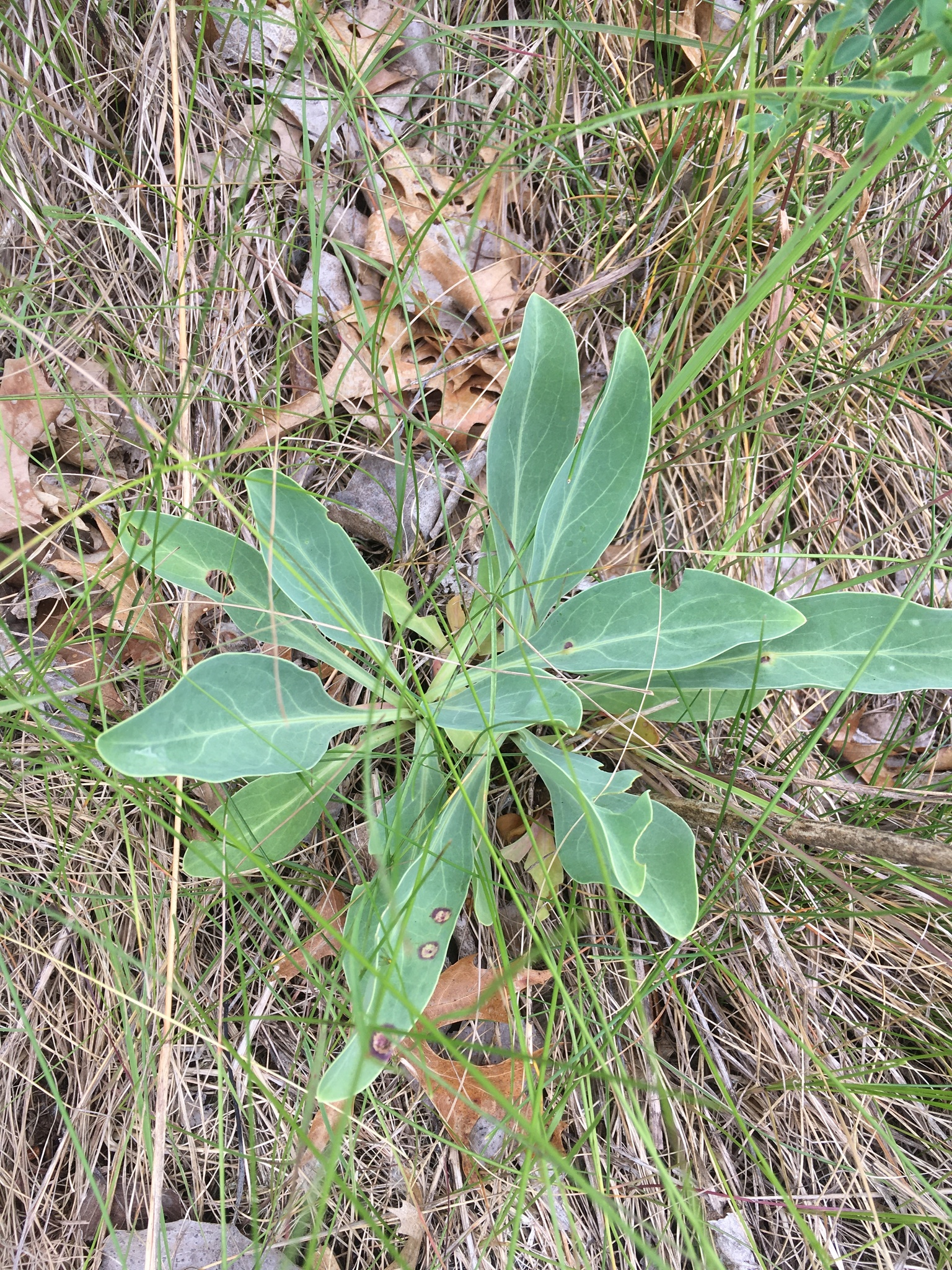
Penstemon grandiflorus basal leaves

Penstemon grandiflorus is a large herbaceous plant with flowering stems that can reach as much as 120 centimeters in height or be as short as 40 centimeters. More commonly the plants will be 50–90 centimeters in height at full size. The whole of the stem and leaves are smooth and free of hairs (glabrous). The leaves springing directly from the base of the plant (basal) or on the lower part of the flowering stem are very large for a penstemon, 30–160 millimeters long and 6–50 millimeters wide. These lower leaves have a range of shapes from similar to a spoon (spatulate) to more of an egg shape (obovate). The base of the lower leaves tapers and the end has a rounded point that can be either narrow or broad. Moving up the flowering stem there will be four to eight pairs of leaves that attach without a short leaf stem (sessile) with bases that wrap part way around the stem, an appearance usually called clasping. They have the same shape range as the lower leaves from like a spoon to like an egg, but are smaller with a maximum length of 110 millimeters and a more common average of 18–90 millimeters.

=== Flowering ===
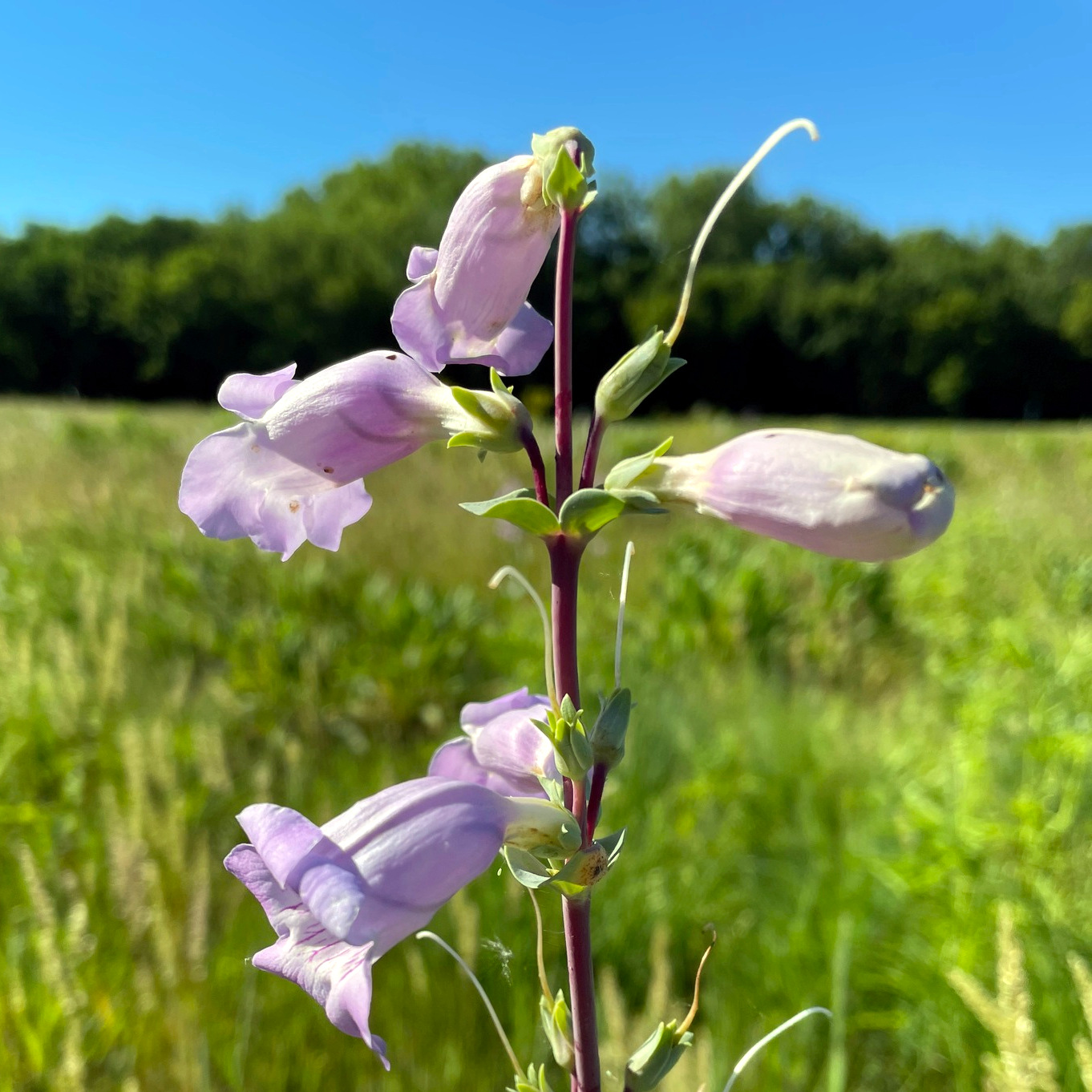
Penstemon grandiflorus flowers

Penstemon grandiflorus has flowering stems are round in cross section and the portion with flowers (the thyrse) is 12–40 centimeters long, though usually shorter than 30 centimeters. The flowering stem has small branchlets off the main stem (interrupted thyrse) in three to nine paired groups on each side of the stem, though there are usually less than seven pairs. Each group (cyme) will have two to four flowers, for four to eight per pair. There are pairs of much smaller leaves (bracts) under where each flower group attaches to the stem. They have a similar shape to the main leaves, egg shaped, widest at the mid base, (elliptic) or circular (orbiculate) and most often 16–83 millimeters long and 16–54 millimeters wide. Though occasionally the bracts will be as little as 9 millimeters long and wide.

The sepals (calyx) of Penstemon grandiflorus are merged around the base of the flower with lobes that are egg shaped (ovate) or shaped like the head of a spear (lanceolate), 7–11 millimeters long and 2.5–4 millimeters wide. The edges of the sepals are smooth, without teeth, but may rarely look like they have been worn away or nibbled (erose). The sepals are green and soft in texture or dried out with a smooth, hairless surface (glabrous). P. grandiflorus has petals (the corolla) that merge to form an inflated tube that measures 35–48 millimeters from base to opening. The petals are blue to pinkish blue with magenta nectar guides. The flower is hairless both externally and internally. The tube portion is 10–13 millimeters long and 15–18 millimeters in diameter. The stamens are contained within the tube of the flower. The fuzzy staminode or beardtounge is 16–21 millimeters long and may either reach beyond the opening of the flower or be contained within it. The tip of the staminode curves backwards and is covered in golden yellow hairs that are up to half a millimeter long. The female pistil (style) is 19–30 millimeters long.

In its native habitat flowering lasts for a few weeks within the period of April through July. The fruit is a capsule that is most often 16–20 millimeters long, but may occasionally reach 25 millimeters, and is 8–15 millimeters in width with a teardrop shape. The brown seeds are large and shaped like rough cubes.

== Taxonomy ==
While there is no dispute as to recognizing Penstemon grandiflorus as a species, there has been division between botanists over the correct name of the species for over a century. The dispute is over if Thomas Nuttall or Frederick Traugott Pursh should be credited for publishing the first description of the species and being able to name it under the principle of priority. Pursh wrote a two volume book about the plants of North America titled Flora Americae Septentrionalis with the first description of many plants. Nuttall is credited with writing the Catalogue of New and Interesting Plants Collected in Upper Louisiana, both have at times been listed as being published in 1813. However, the second volume of Pursh's book, where the description of the species is located, was almost undoubtedly published in 1814.

Botanists who credit the German-American botanist Pursh use the name Penstemon bradburyi. They list Nuttall's first publication as 1818 in the book The Genera of North American Plants: And a Catalogue of the Species, to the Year 1817 with the view that his earlier book did not have a valid description of the species.

The American botanist Francis W. Pennell was one of the most prominent of the advocates for crediting Nuttall and using the name Penstemon grandiflorus. In a 1926 paper he quotes the short description from the catalogue to establish priority for the name. Though the spelling used in the original publication is Penstemon grandiflorum. In a 1956 paper in Rhodora, Arthur Cronquist and his coauthors made the argument that P. grandiflorus had been in use since 1829 and that in the interests of stability it should be retained.

As of 2023 Penstemon bradburyi is listed as the correct name by Plants of the World Online (POWO) and World Plants. POWO lists Penstemon grandiflorus as a superfluous name. World Flora Online (WFO) has a confusing position listing both names as accepted in 2023. Disagreeing with these databases the Missouri Botanical Garden, the USDA Natural Resources Conservation Service PLANTS database (PLANTS), the Flora of North America (FNA), and NatureServe all list the species as Penstemon grandiflorus.

=== Names ===
The common names of Penstemon grandiflorus include the usual division between using "penstemon" as a common name and "beardtongue" as a common name for the genus. For example "shell-leaf beardtongue" in FNA and "shell-leaved penstemon" in the Growing Penstemons bulletin from Colorado State Extension. Other names used for the species include "large-flowered penstemon", "large penstemon", "large flower beardtounge", and "wild foxglove".

The Lakota name for this plant is kimi'milia tawana'hca, which translates as butterfly flower.

== Range and habitat ==
The exact natural range of Penstemon grandiflorus is somewhat uncertain. It is generally agreed that it grows from Texas to Montana and then east to Minnesota, Wisconsin, and Illinois. Outside this triangle on the Great Plains of North America it is uncertain how far the native range extends. All sources but NatureServe list it has growing in New Mexico. Both POWO and NatureServe list it as an introduced species in Indiana, while the other sources either do not list it or do not make that distinction. Only POWO lists it as an introduced species in Massachusetts, Connecticut, Ohio, and Michigan, though most other sources list it as present in those states.

The preferred natural habitat for Penstemon grandiflorus is in sandy soils or lime to chalky soils (calcareous). They are a plant of tallgrass, mixed-grass, sand prairies, and oak savannas, open sandy woods, and sandy roadsides.

Penstemon grandiflorus was last evaluated by NatureServe in 1993. At that time it was evaluated with a conservation status of secure, G5 as they thought the global population was not significantly declining. There are, however, threats to the species at the local level. They have found it is vulnerable (S3) in Iowa, imperiled (S2) in Wyoming, and critically imperiled (S1) in Montana, Colorado, Oklahoma, Missouri, and Illinois. The range for the species is very limited in Colorado, only being found in a few counties on its eastern border. It is found in a limited number of northern counties in Illinois and has been designated an endangered plant by the state.

== Ecology ==
In areas with plains pocket gophers (Geomys bursarius) the numbers of Penstemon grandiflorus are reduced because they readily eat the plants. Penstemon grandiflorus is somewhat fire adapted. Older plants show very little reduction after controlled burns and only some of the younger plants are negatively impacted. In oak savannas fire is also an important force in maintaining suitable openings for plants like P. grandiflorus. Flower visitor include bumblebees and hummingbirds.

== Uses ==
=== Cultivation ===
Because it is the, "Largest and showiest of the North American prairie penstemons," the shell-leaf penstemon is often grown in dry landscaping and xeriscape gardens. Adult plants are resistant to damage by slugs and also not preferred as forage by deer. They require a well drained soil such as gravel, sand, sandy loam, or dry loam.

A variety of shell-leaf penstemon with a wider range of flower colors from white to deep purple was developed by Denver resident Mary Ann Heacock. Under the name 'Prairie Jewell' it is promoted by the Colorado horticultural non-profit Plant Select. Other species included in hybridization by Heacock included Penstemon roseus, Parry's penstemon (Penstemon parryi), and scarlet penstemon (Penstemon murrayanus). Dale Lindgren, a professor at the University of Nebraska, developed a pure white cultivar named 'Prairie Snow'. His 'War Axe' cultivar had deep colors from pink to purple.

In a garden setting the plants typically have a three to five year lifespan. New plants will volunteer from seed, but not aggressively. Seeds require 30 days of cold-moist stratification for good germination rates. Shell-leaf penstemon is hardy in USDA zones 3–7.

=== Traditional uses ===
The Dakota people are recorded by the ethnographer Dilwyn J. Rogers as using the boiled root for chest pain.

== See also ==
List of Penstemon species
