= 1930 World Fencing Championships =

International fencing competition

1930 World Championships in Fencing
- Host city: Liège, Belgium

The 1930 World Fencing Championships were held in Liège, Belgium.

== Medal summary ==
=== Men's events ===
Event	Gold	Silver	Bronze
Individual Foil	(Kingdom of Italy) Giulio Gaudini	(Kingdom of Italy) Gustavo Marzi	(Kingdom of Italy) Gioacchino Guaragna
Team Foil	(Kingdom of Italy) Italy	France	Belgium
Individual Sabre	(Hungary) György Piller	(Hungary) Attila Petschauer	(Hungary) György Doros
Team Sabre	Hungary	(Kingdom of Italy) Italy	(Second Polish Republic) Poland
Individual Épée	(France) Philippe Cattiau	(Kingdom of Italy) Alfredo Pezzana	(France) Andre Rossignol
Team Épée	Belgium	(Kingdom of Italy) Italy	France

=== Women's events ===
Event	Gold	Silver	Bronze
Individual Foil	(Belgium) Jenny Addams	(Kingdom of Italy) Germana Schwaiger	(United Kingdom) Mary Ann Venables
