= Bionomia =

Database of biological specimen records

- Available in: English
- Website: bionomia.net
- Commercial: No
- Launched: August, 2018
- Current status: Active

Bionomia (formerly Bloodhound Tracker) is a database and database entry tool which permits the name strings of collectors, and of taxonomists who determine specimen data, to be assigned to the unique person who collected or identified the specimen. If the person is living, this is done via their ORCID iD, and if dead, via their Wikidata identifier. It thereby resolves ambiguity where two or more collectors have similar names; or where one collector has worked under two names, or a single name written in two or more ways. The specimen data associated with, and used by, Bionomia are the aggregated GBIF data.

This mechanism of contributing to specimen data arose from a project initiated by the Muséum national d'histoire naturelle, Paris (MNHN) in March 2019, and is motivated (in part) by "the world-wide importance of natural history collections, (which) are at risk because they are critically underfunded or undervalued. A contributing factor for this apparent neglect is the lack of a professional reward system that quantifies and illustrates the breadth and depth of expertise required to collect and identify specimens, maintain them, digitize their labels, mobilize the data, and enhance these data as errors and omissions are identified by stakeholders." It is also motivated by the fact that the important work of taxonomists in identifying specimens in collections across the world fails to be recognised, and this failure, fails both institutions and taxonomists. In August 2018, Bionomia was launched (under the name Bloodhound Tracker) as a submission to the Ebbe Nielsen Challenge.

Other papers which set the scene, the rationale and the purpose of Bionomia are:

The primary task in Bionomia is to resolve the name strings of the various collectors and the taxonomists who have determined the species of a specimen into unique human beings. This having been done, the records of plant and animal specimens contained in GBIF downloads (permanently referenced by DOIs), together with the papers derived from them, and linked to the Bionomia people profiles. Hence, the taxonomic work fundamental to plant research can be tracked back to both the holding institution and to the taxonomist, linking institution, taxonomist, and the science generated.

Thus, Bionomia, by quantifying taxonomists' contributions, allows their work to be counted, not only in terms of specimen counts, but also in terms of counts of scientific papers.

== Contributing ==
To attribute collection/identification data in Bionomia and to see the profile data of collectors/identifiers, a person needs to be logged on to the Bionomia site via an ORCID ID (preferably public).

Collector profiles are by default private, which means that the profile of any living person who has contributed to specimen data aggregated by GBIF cannot be seen until the particular collector/identifier makes their profile public. A private profile means that a collector's data is neither visible nor verifiable by others. (However, one can attribute specimens to that person.)

On pressing "Help Attribute" for a profile, GBIF specimen records with strings forming part of the person's name appear. Sometimes it is clear from the collector/identifier string, the date, the institution and the country in which it was collected, that the specimen should be attributed to the person. Often, however, all the data transcribed for the specimen must be examined, and there may also be a reasonably high resolution photograph of the specimen itself together with all its annotations over the years. enabling one to accept or reject the specimen as having been collected by the person. When one is examining the specimen, one is in the GBIF database itself, and when one notes an error, it is possible to notify the problem by email to the curator of the institution which provided the data.

== Examples ==
=== Living people ===
For example, Kevin Thiele's profile on Bionomia shows that he has determined (identified) some 11,291 botanical specimens from at least 12 countries, collected some 4,797 specimens collected from at least 4 countries, and that 21 of these specimens (identified or collected) have been used in 10 published papers, and that as of June 5, 2020, there remain a further 6% of specimens which may or may not have been collected or identified by him. Pressing on the tab "Specialities" shows that he has collected 542 Myrtaceae specimens and 459 Poaceae specimens, while identifying 3829 Dilleniaceae and 2916 Rhamnaceae specimens. The tab "Deposited At" reveals that the specimens he has collected are spread across 22 institutions.

Shelley James' profile shows she has determined 2836 botanical specimens from at least 20 countries, collected 3522 from 5 countries, and that 4457 of the specimens she has identified or collected have been used in 33 scientific papers, while Stylianos Chatzimanolis (a beetle systematist) has collected 31,493 specimens identified from at least 38 countries, 33,667 specimens collected from at least 15 countries, of which 6 have been used in 3 scientific papers.

=== Earlier collectors ===
Mary Ann McHard, a Western Australian pioneer, who collected for Ferdinand von Mueller (and whose profile is also public) is seen to have collected at least 2072 extant specimens, and these still contribute to scientific knowledge with 12 of her specimens contributing to a scientific paper.

Hermann Beckler, who collected in Australia between 1856 and 1862, has 3179 extant specimens collected by him, some supposedly collected in the US (source GBIF), (thus illustrating the power of this project/website in that transcription and interpretation errors made in databasing specimens may be noticed and corrected.) Eight of his specimens have been used in four scientific publications.
