= Mary Ann Orger =

British actress (1788–1849)

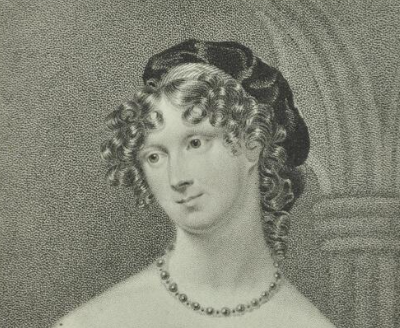
- Orger as Flippanta; from an 1821 engraving
- Born: Mary Ann Ives; 25 February 1888; London, England
- Died: 1 October 1849 (aged 61); Brighton, England
- Occupations: Actress and playwright
- Spouse: Thomas Orger

Mary Ann Orger born Mary Ann Ivers (25 February 1788 – 1 October 1849) was a leading actress in Scotland and Drury Lane. She was a playwright and the mother of composer Caroline Reinagle.

== Life ==
Mary Ann Ives was born in London, England, in 1788. Her father was a musician, William Ivers, and her mother was an actress who allowed her daughter to appear. At a young age, Mary Ann was being carried on to the stage and she was on the playbill at the age of five. By the age of nine, she was singing in Brighton and at the age of eleven she was taking the part of a gypsy at Frogmore at a fête organised by Queen Charlotte.

By the age of fifteen, she was admired by Thomas Orger, who married her in 1804. Thomas had been a Quaker, who did not visit theatres, so he had to leave that group when he married her. She was well read and her husband, Dr Thomas Orger was a translator of Ovid and Anacreon, and he had written a book about Napoleon. He did not object to her acting and he become a founder member of the Swedenborg Society and the editor of Intellectual Repository. Mary too, like her husband, became a member of the Swedenborgian church.

She had a pause after her marriage before she returned to the stage in Edinburgh in 1805 as "Amelia Wildenshaw" in Lovers Vows. She did not get on with the manager there so she headed north to appear in Aberdeen. She then moved to Glasgow in 1806, when the company included Maria Kelly, Lydia Kelly and Miss Frances. In Glasgow, she appeared in Rosoman Mountain's benefit performance.

She made £78 as a result of a benefit performance.

She was a leading actress and the mother of the composer Caroline Reinagle who was born in 1817.

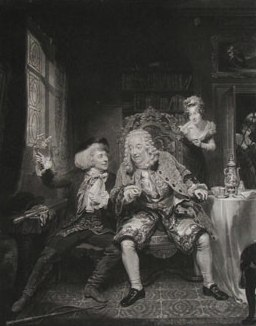
in Lock and Key in 1824

In 1807, she appeared in Glasgow as Caroline Sedley in James Kenney's False Alarm in a benefit for the singer and actress Rosoman Mountain.

She made her debut at Drury Lane as Lydia Languish in The Rivals on 4 October 1808. Despite the fire in the following year, she was at Drury Lane until 1831, although this was not an exclusive arrangement.

On 10 March 1825, a farce she had written, Change Partners, was performed at Drury Lane. She died in Brighton on 1 October 1849.
