= Rosemond Mountain =

British actress

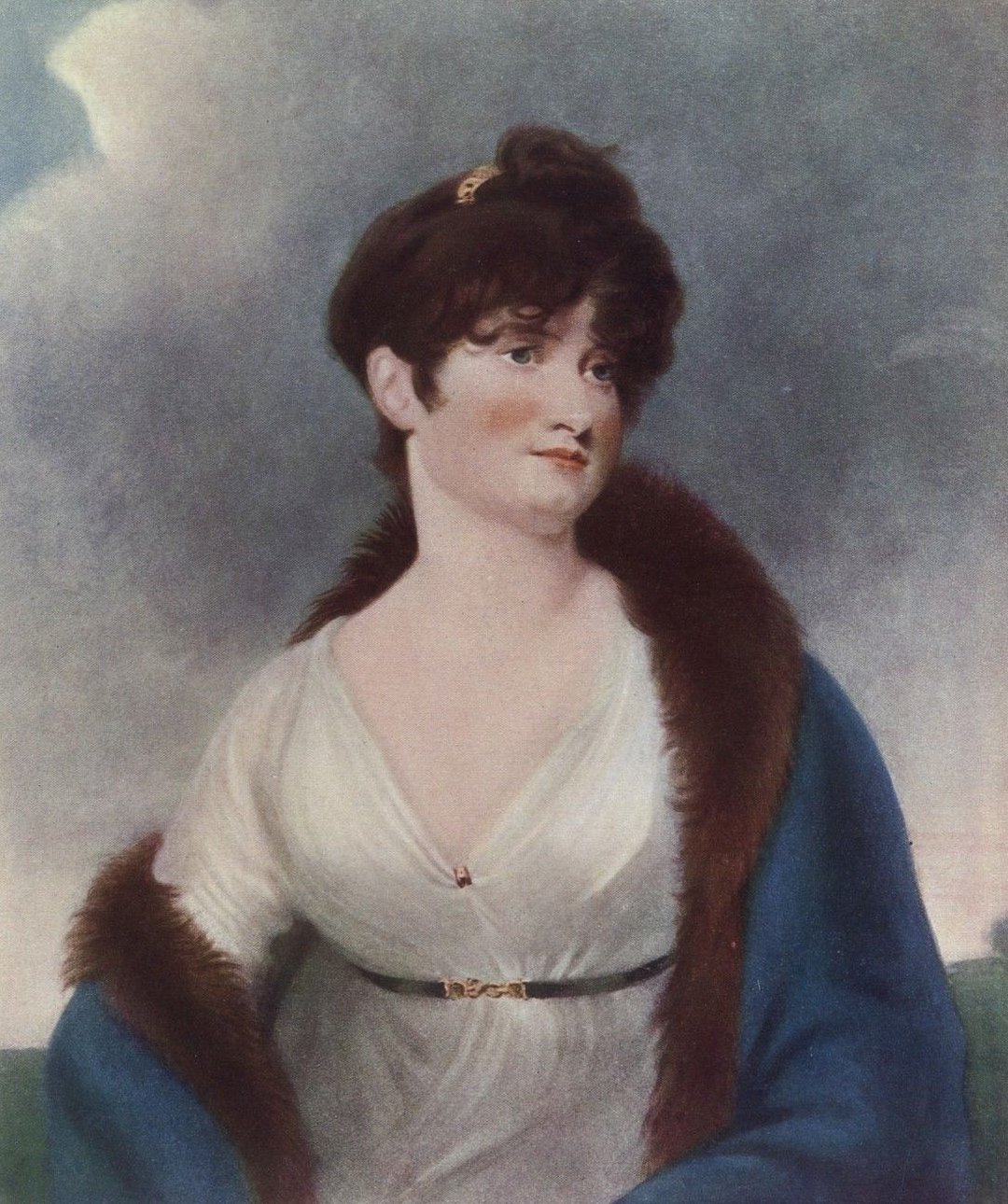
- An engraving after J.J.Masquerier
- Born: around 1768; London, UK
- Died: 3 July 1841; London, UK
- Known for: singing

Rosemond Mountain or Rosemond Wilkinson (c. 1768 – died 3 July 1841) was a British actress and soprano. She was said to be the "best female singer on the English stage" from 1800.

== Life ==
Wilkinson was born in London around 1768 to a family of performers. Her father and maybe an aunt, Isabella, performed on tightropes and her mother also acted and helped. Three of her elder siblings, George, Frederick and Caroline, appeared at Sadler's Wells, before she was born, playing musical glasses and showing balancing skills. She was trained for the theatre by Charles Dibdin but this resulted in only minor roles initially. On 4 November 1782 she appeared in a major role that gave her work until 1784. She played Madame Hazard in Mount Parnassus or Fairy World at the Surrey Theatre.

By the end of 1784 she was appearing for Tate Wilkinson on his York Circuit. Her family travelled north with her, but the coincidence of surname did not indicate that they were related to Tate. She played Clarissa in Lionel and Clarissa opposite Dorothy Jordan who played Lionel.

Wilkinson started a long association with Covent Garden in 1786 which continued until 1798. During this time she married John Mountain in 1787. Her husband was initially a violinist but he rose to lead the Vauxhall Gardens' orchestra until he started to lead the Covent Garden musicians in 1794. By this time "Mrs Mountain" had returned to the theatre after a relatively brief argument with the Covent Garden management from 1792 to 1793. She was able to take major singing roles in Love in a Village as Lucinda.

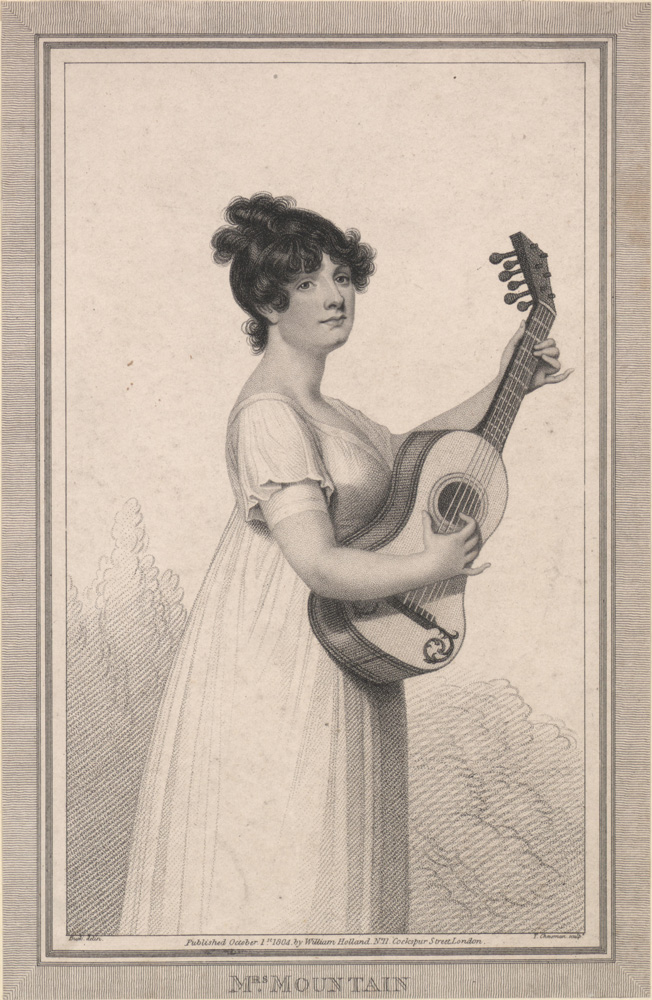
Engraving of Rosemond Mountain with guitar

At some point she was trained by the Italian castrato Venanzio Rauzzini. She was said to be the "best female singer on the English stage" from 1800 when she appeared as Polly in the Beggar's Opera. In 1807 she had a benefit in Glasgow which included James Kenney's False Alarm. The cast included the comic actress Mary Ann Orger.

In 1819 she appeared as Maid Marian in the burletta Robin Hood and Little John at the Surrey Theatre with Charles Incledon as Robin Hood. Mountain died in London at her home in 1841.
