= Mary Ann Neeley =

American author and historian (1932–2018)

Mary Ann Neeley (November 5, 1932 – August 29, 2018) was an author and official historian for the city of Montgomery, Alabama. She served as executive director of Landmarks Foundation of Montgomery, a non-profit organization dedicated to historic preservation, from 1979 until 2003. Mrs. Neely's walking tours of downtown Montgomery and Oakwood Cemetery were a very popular activity for locals and tourists alike. She developed an annual conference that brought together academics, writers, and other historians, which explored numerous historical topics and drew together attendants from across the region. Along with being an author and a local historian, Neeley also taught courses at both Auburn University and Huntingdon College.

== Education ==
After graduating high-school in Clanton, Neeley earned her bachelor's degrees in English and History from Huntingdon College in 1954, then a master's degree in history from Auburn University. She then became an adjunct instructor at Auburn University and Huntingdon.

== Personal life ==
Neeley was born on November 5, 1932. She was married to Aubrey Neeley and together had three children, six grandchildren, and four great-grandchildren. She was frequently interviewed by news outlets for her advanced knowledge of local history. Neeley died on August 29, 2018, at the age of 85. Following her death, the Montgomery City Council unanimously voted to honor her by renaming College Street Park in Cloverdale, to Mary Ann Neeley Park.

== Career ==
Neeley was an adjunct instructor at her both of her alma maters, Huntingdon College and Auburn University, the latter where she received her master's degree in history. Neeley also worked at the Alabama Department of Archives as a researcher for decades. She served as the executive director of The Landmarks Foundation, a non-profit organization started in 1967, from 1979 to 2003. Much of her time as executive director was spent on Montgomery's Old Alabama Town, which is four blocks of 19th-century buildings that have been restored display life as it was lived in Alabama from the 1830s through the 1890s. Throughout her career as Montgomery's official historian, she authored and co-authored several books on the local history of Montgomery.

== Bibliography ==
- The Way It Was/1850-1930: Photographs of Montgomery and Her Central Alabama Neighbors (1985, Landmarks Foundation of Montgomery)
- Old Alabama Town: An Illustrated Guide (1987, Montgomery)
- Montgomery: Capital City Corners (1997, Images of America)
- Montgomery and the River Region Sketchbook (2005, Indigo Publishing)
- Montgomery and the River Region: Yesterday, Today and Tomorrow (2007, Beers & Associates)
- The Works of Matthew Blue: Montgomery's First Historian (2010, with Edwin C. Bridges)
- Montgomery in the 20th Century: Tradition & Change, 1880–2010 (2013, HPN Books)
