= Mary Ann McHard =

Botanical collector for F. von Mueller in WA (1825 - 1912)

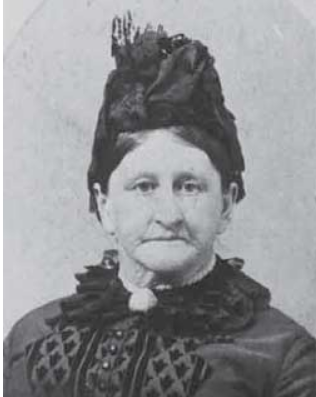
- Born: 25 December 1825
- Died: 18 June 1912 (aged 86); Bunbury, Western Australia
- Scientific career
- Fields: Botany

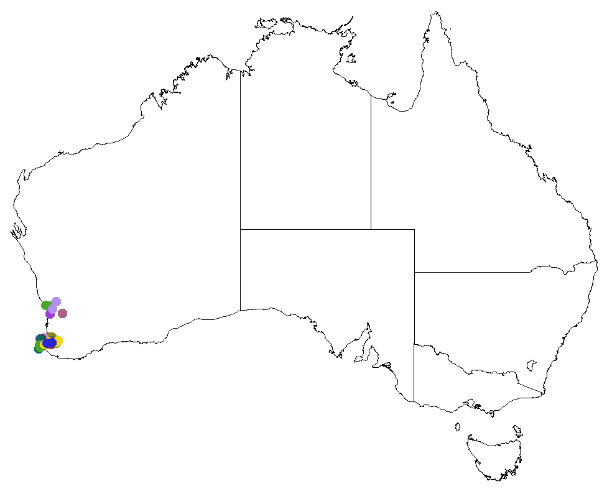
Collections map

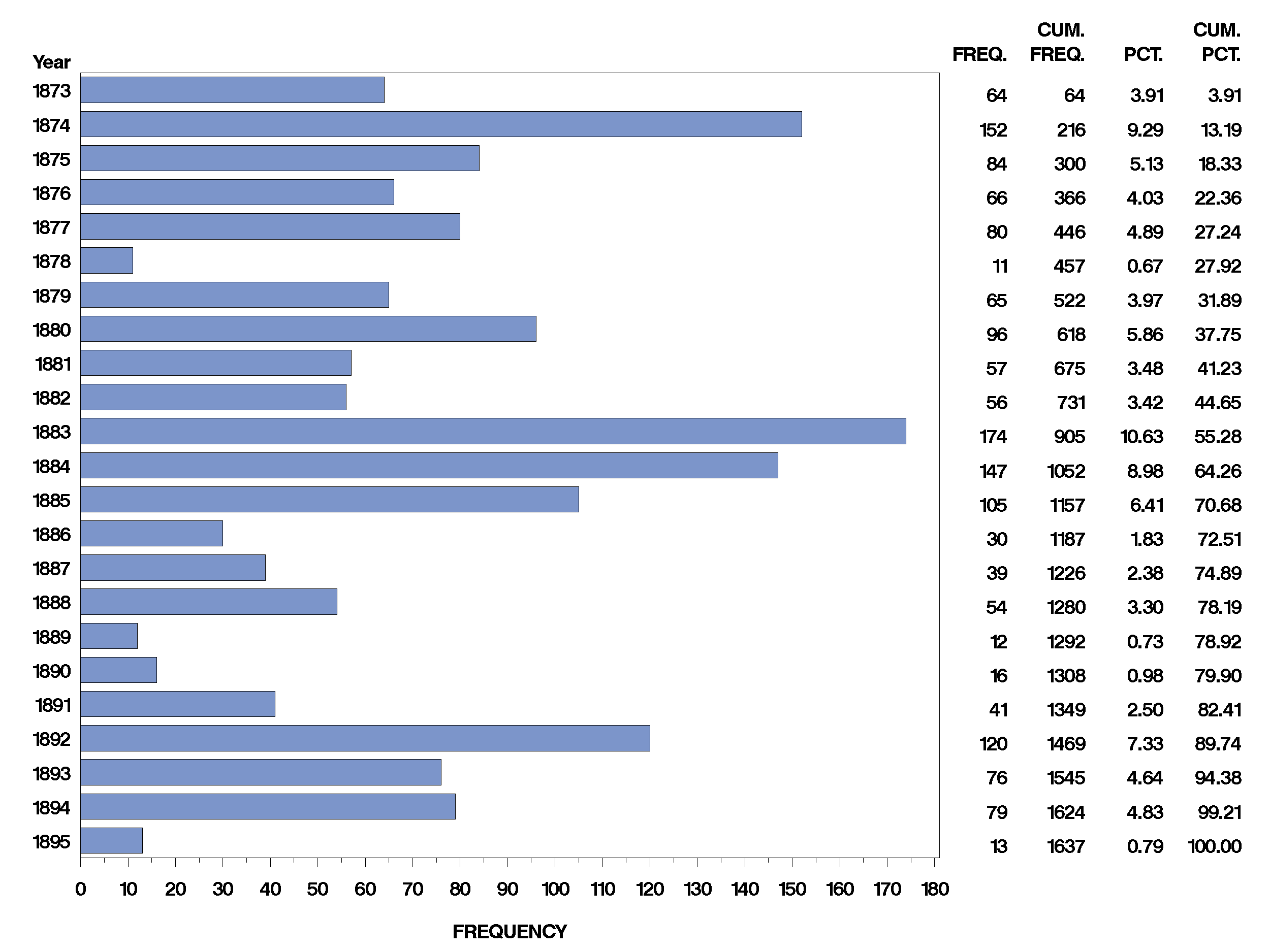
Collections by year (AVH)

Mary Ann McHard (1825–1912), née Jones, was a pioneering Western Australian woman who contributed to Australian botany by collecting over 2,000 plant specimens for Ferdinand von Mueller and sending them to the newly created National Herbarium of Victoria, established by Mueller in 1853.

== Life ==
Mary Ann McHard arrived in Australia at the age of four; arriving together with her family in Fremantle, Western Australia, on 29 October 1829 aboard the Lotus. Within a year of the family's arrival, her mother died, and her father was left to look after the five young children.

The family lived in Perth, where she married Thomas McHard in 1845, by whom she had four daughters. With the death of her husband in 1864, McHard, her children, her father and her two unmarried brothers, took up land near Balingup on the Blackwood River. After the death of their father, the two brothers and McHard continued working the property but with the death of R.T. Jones (a brother), she and her remaining brother moved to Bunbury, where she died in 1912.

== Collections ==
She collected from Blackwood River (1873–1895), Preston River (1876), Geographe Bay (1881), Busselton (1884), Augusta, Cape Leeuwin and York (1885), Bayswater (1887), Gingin (1892–1893), Victoria Plains (1893), from near the Murchison River (1894) and from Dardanup. Some of her specimens were types: Pultenaea skinneri F.Muell. (1873 MEL 2057199A), Xerotes endlicheri F.Muell. (1874) (current name Lomandra odora), and Boronia machardiana F.Muell. (1875) honouring her (current name Boronia crenulata subsp. viminea (Lindl.) Paul G.Wilson).

In all, the National Herbarium of Victoria (MEL) still holds 2,022 of the specimens she collected for Mueller (recorded under the various names of Mrs M. McHard / Mrs McHard / Mrs MacHard/ Mrs McHardy / Mrs M. Hard), while the website Bionomia shows her as having collected at least 2,072 extant specimens, and that 12 of these have contributed to a recent (2020) scientific paper.

The seven surviving letters between Mueller and McHard do not indicate how McHard started to collect for Mueller, but it is difficult not to believe that Mueller's extensive advertising in colonial papers was influential.
