= Mary Anne Cosgrave =

Mother Patrick Mary Anne Cosgrave

Personal life
- Born: 22 May 1863 Summerhill, County Meath, Ireland
- Died: 31 July 1900 (aged 37) Salisbury, Rhodesia

Religious life
- Religion: Christian

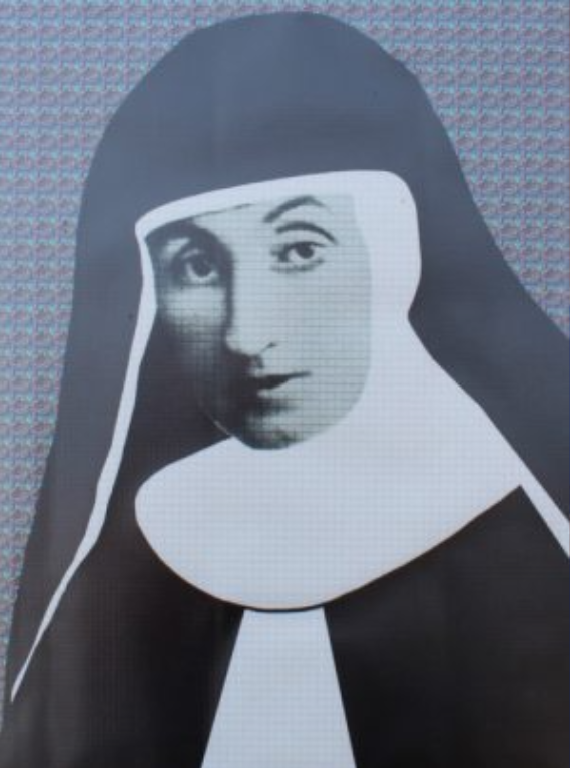
Mary Ann Cosgrave, who took the name Mary Patrick when she joined the Dominican nuns.

Mother Patrick Mary Anne Cosgrave (22 May 1863 – 31 July 1900) was an Irish Dominican nun, pioneer nurse in Rhodesia, educationist, and prioress.

== Early life ==
Mary Anne Cosgrave was born in Summerhill, County Meath, on 22 May 1863, one of four surviving siblings, two sons and two daughters. Her father, James Cosgrave, was in the Royal Irish Constabulary and was from Ballysilla, near Oulart Hill, County Wexford. Her mother was Mary (née Rochfort). Both of her parents died from tuberculosis, her father in November 1869, and her mother in 1870. Cosgrave's brothers found jobs with the Dublin & Wexford Railway, the older brother also contracting tuberculosis. The other brother then emigrated to the United States, where it is believed he too died of tuberculosis. Cosgrave and her sister went to live with a relative, John Cosgrave of Ballinvary, Davidstown, Enniscorthy, County Wexford. She was educated at the Loreto convent, Enniscorthy, leaving at age 15. Cosgrave met Bishop James David Ricards, vicar apostolic of the eastern districts of the Cape Colony, when he visited Wexford in 1880 looking for recruits to the Dominican convent in King William's Town. Inspired by his call, Cosgrave travelled to King William's Town to enter the order at age 16 arriving on 19 January 1881, eventually taking the name Sister Patrick. There she taught at the convent school, as well as in East London and Potchefstroom.

== Career ==
Cosgrave responded to an appeal from the superior of the Jesuit Zambezi mission, Fr A. Daignault, in 1889 to volunteer to aid in establishing an ambulance and hospital service for the British South Africa Company's pioneer column which was to occupy Mashonaland. Appointed mother superior of five sisters, the group of nuns stayed behind at Macloutsie at the base hospital. She befriended Col. Edward Pennefather, the commander of the column, who was also from County Wexford. The sisters travelled to Fort Salisbury in Mashonaland in July 1891 with Major Arthur Glyn Leonard. Having become friends with Leonard in spite of their political differences, he described Cosgrave: "She is a young Irish woman with a pretty brogue, and a face which is sweet beyond measure – not with the beauty of the flower that fades, but with the beauty of a pure and noble expression that is immortal, though tinged at times with a shade of sadness."

Once in Salisbury, Cosgrave organised the first hospital, which was located in a series of grass huts and tents before a purpose-built hospital was built in 1895. She became known for treating everyone equally and for her good humour, having once danced an Irish jig to entertain and rally her patients. She opened the Salisbury convent in October 1892, which housed the first school for Europeans and would go on to educate Doris Lessing, among others. After the occupation of Matabeleland in 1894, she established a hospital and St George's College for Boys in Bulawayo.

During the African uprisings in Matabeleland and Mashonaland in 1896, Cosgrave accompanied relief columns to Gwelo to organise an emergency hospital, and was later awarded the British South Africa Company's campaign medal. In 1898 the Rhodesian Dominicans spilt from the mother house at King William's Town and became an independent community. Cosgrave toured England in June 1898 to recruit postulants. During this trip she was invested with the Royal Red Cross. When she returned to Southern Rhodesia, she was elected prioress of the Dominican order.

== Death and legacy ==
Cosgrave died in the hospital she had founded on 31 July 1900 of tuberculosis. Her funeral was the largest European funeral to have been held in the territory at that time, and she is buried in the pioneer section of Salisbury Cemetery. After her death, Sir Charles Coghlan, led an annual pilgrimage to her grave on St Patrick's day. Her grave was marked with a seven-foot-high granite Celtic cross designed by Hugh Scott, and was unveiled by Sir Marshal Clarke on 17 March 1903. The original hospital building she founded, a prefabricated hut, is now a museum dedicated to her. Cosgrave was included in a series of stamps featuring pioneers of Rhodesia in the 1970s. In recognition of her contributions, Mother Patrick Convent Primary School was established in the Mainway Meadows suburb of Harare in her honour, officially opening in November 2011 under the stewardship of the Dominican Missionary Sisters of the Sacred Heart of Jesus.
