= Ken Croswell =

American astronomer

Ken Croswell is an American astronomer and writer. His first degree, from Washington University in St. Louis, mixed science and wider interests, majoring in physics and minoring in English literature. He also got a PhD in astronomy from Harvard University for studying the Milky Way's halo.

He is primarily known as a writer on astronomy and space topics. He has written regularly the New Scientist, New York Times and various magazines in the popular science press. He is also the author of six books on astronomy, including The Alchemy of the Heavens and Planet Quest, and often reports on the radio program the John Batchelor Show.

== Publications ==
=== Books ===
- Croswell, Ken (1995). The alchemy of the heavens : searching for meaning in the Milky Way. New York: Anchor Books. ISBN 978-0-385-47213-5.
- — (1999). Planet quest : the epic discovery of alien solar systems. Oxford University Press.

=== Essays and reporting ===
- Croswell, Ken (April 2013). "Unravelling a Magellanic mystery". Scientific American. 308 (4): 8. Bibcode:2013SciAm.308d..16C. doi:10.1038/scientificamerican0413-16. PMID 23539779.
- — (April 2013). "Wanted : new worlds beyond Pluto". Scientific American. 308 (4): 13. Bibcode:2013SciAm.308d..25C. doi:10.1038/scientificamerican0413-25a.
- — (May 2013). "Tadpoles in space". Advances. Astronomy. Scientific American. 308 (5): 12. Bibcode:2013SciAm.308e..19C. doi:10.1038/scientificamerican0513-19. PMID 23627208.
