= Mary Ann MacKenzie =

American politician

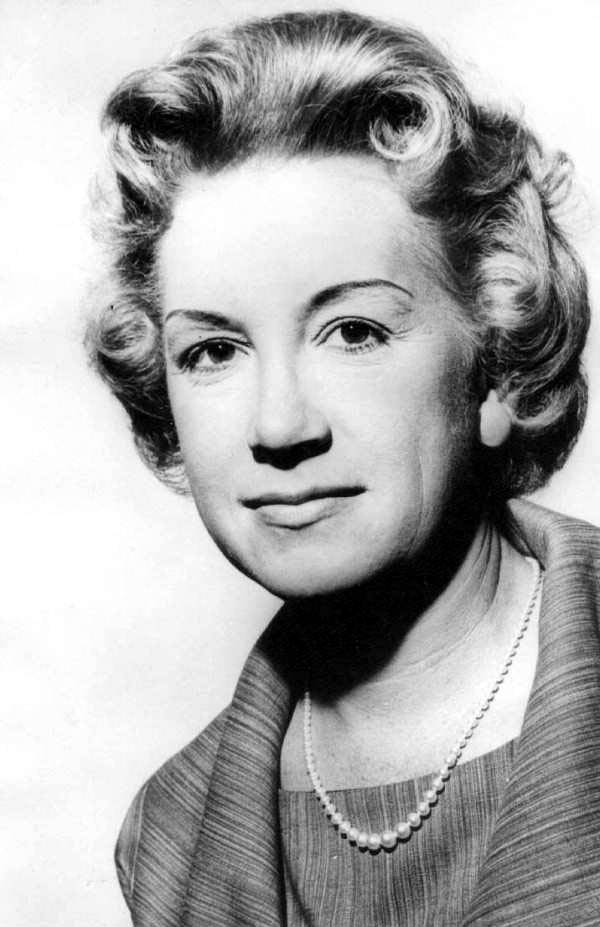

Member of the Florida House of Representatives from the Dade County district
- In office 1963–1966

Personal details
- Born: November 22, 1925 Hornell, New York, U.S.
- Died: December 24, 1997 (aged 72) Dade County, Florida, U.S.
- Party: Democratic
- Spouse: Donald Grant MacKenzie
- Children: two
- Occupation: lawyer

Mary Ann MacKenzie (November 22, 1925 – December 24, 1997) was a politician in the American state of Florida. She served in the Florida House of Representatives from 1963 to 1966, representing Dade County. She later was a judge on the Eleventh Judicial Circuit Court of Florida.
