= Mary Muir =

New Zealand nurse (1881–1962)

Mary Ann Muir (13 October 1881 – 5 October 1962) was a New Zealand nurse who served in World War I.

Muir was born and raised in south Taranaki, in New Zealand's North Island. Her parents were farmers in Oaonui. Muir completed her nursing training at New Plymouth Hospital in 1909 and worked as a district nurse in her home area. In 1915 she joined the New Zealand Army Nursing Service and departed on the SS Maheno. However, Muir contracted typhoid and was sent back to New Zealand. After recuperating at Trentham Military Camp, Muir went back to England and nursed in a general hospital there. She was later sent to France and served on the Western Front at Amiens. For her war service, she received the 1914 Star and the Victory Medal.

After the war, Muir returned to New Zealand and Taranaki and worked with her sister Catherine to set up the Iona Private Hospital in New Plymouth. The pair ran the hospital for 20 years. Shortly after her return, the people of Oaonui presented her with an engraved medallion to show their appreciation of her war work.
