= MaryAnn Hill =

American statistical software developer

MaryAnn H. Hill is a retired American statistical software developer who contributed to statistics packages including BMDP, SYSTAT, and SPSS. She also published fundamental research on robust statistics, as well as contributing statistical analyses to several medical research publications.

== Career ==
In the 1970s, Hill worked for the University of California, Los Angeles (UCLA) as a developer of the BMDP (Biomedical Data Processing) package, including developing robust regression and ridge regression methods for BMDP. She was later also credited with writing most of the documentation of the BMDP system.

In the 1980s, she was listed as a senior statistician in the UCLA biomathematics program, also affiliated with the VA Medical Center in Los Angeles, and later in the UCLA Department of Psychiatry and as an employee of BMDP Statistical Software, Inc. By the early 1990s, she was working in the department of statistics at the University of Michigan and at Systat Software Inc., working on the SYSTAT statistics package. SYSTAT was sold in 1995 to SPSS, and in 1997 she authored a manual on missing data for SPSS, Inc. She was also listed as a senior statistician at NORC at the University of Chicago in 1997.

== Recognition ==
Hill was named as a Fellow of the American Statistical Association in 1995.

== Personal life ==
Hill is the mother of biology professor Karlyn Mueller-Hill, who writes in her 1999 doctoral thesis that Hill's "idea of child day care was to bring [Karlyn] to her graduate classes in statistics".
