= Mary Ann Eliza Agnew =

Australian education advocate

- Born: 6 November 1857; Openshaw, Manchester, England
- Died: 14 June 1940 (aged 82); Mater Misericordiae Hospital, South Brisbane
- Occupation: Kindergarten teacher
- Years active: November 1870–c. 1920

Mary Ann Eliza Agnew (6 November 1857 – 14 June 1940) was a kindergarten teacher and education advocate in Queensland, Australia. She had a significant influence on early childhood schooling in Queensland.

== Biography ==
Mary Ann Eliza Agnew was born on 6 November 1857 in Openshaw, near Manchester, England. Her father, Hugh Agnew, was a chain manufacturer, and her mother was Eliza (née Byrom). She began her career as a teacher in November 1870, and worked at the Liverpool Training College from January 1876 to December 1877.

Beginning in 1878, she was headmistress of St Francis' Girls School in West Gorton, Manchester. In August 1890, Mary Agnew arrived in Queensland, Australia, and joined the Department of Public Instruction. She began teaching at Ipswich North Girls' and Infants' School on 22 September 1890, but contracted typhoid fever the same year. Agnew subscribed to the pedagogy of Friedrich Fröbel and upon her appointment as kindergarten instructor in August 1891, she began introducing Fröbelian teaching methods to schools in Brisbane. However, she believed that schools were interpreting Fröbel's principles incorrectly.

While she returned to classroom teaching after being relieved of her instructor duties in July 1893, Agnew continued to submit recommendations to improve the quality of infant education in Australia. In 1910, she was appointed head teacher at Dutton Park Girls' and Infants' School. Her advice began to bear fruit especially after a teaching conference in July 1911. Agnew retired from teaching in 1920 and spent her final years in Ingleston, Wynnum South. She died on 14 June 1940, aged 82, at Mater Misericordiae Hospital in South Brisbane and was buried according to Catholic rites in Nudgee cemetery.
