= György Doros =

Hungarian writer

- Born: 2 April 1890; Odorheiu Secuiesc, Romania
- Died: 6 August 1945 (aged 55); Budapest, Hungary
- Occupation: Writer

György Doros (2 April 1890 – 6 August 1945) was a Hungarian writer and fencer. His work was part of the literature event in the art competition at the 1932 Summer Olympics.

He placed third in the individual sabre at the 1930 World Fencing Championships. On 4 August 1939, the Council of Ministers awarded him the Cross of the Officer of the Hungarian Order of Merit for his services to international fencing.

He wrote books on sports psychology and opposed women's sports.

After World War II, he was banned from practicing law because of his support of the Arrow Cross Party and the Nazi Party. On 6 August 1945, he and his wife killed themselves.

== Works ==
- Ethische und psychologische Probleme des Leistungssports [Ethical and Psychological Problems of Competitive Sports]. 1931.
