= Mary S. Sutherland =

Dr. Mary S. Sutherland, EdD, MPH, FAAHB was professor of health education at Florida State University, where she held appointments in the Department of Curriculum and Instruction and the Department of Human Services and Studies. She coauthored more than 50 papers in peer-reviewed journals.

Sutherland earned her Bachelor of Science degree in health and physical education from Michigan State University in 1962, an MS degree in physical education from the University of Tennessee in 1964, and an EdD in health, physical education and recreation from the University of Alabama at Tuscaloosa in 1973.

She later returned to the University of Tennessee for an MPH degree in community health and health planning in 1978. Upon completion of her EdD she joined the faculty of the Department of Health Science at the State University of New York at Brockport, where she served as coordinator of the school health education program from 1974 to 1977.

From 1978 to 1980, Sutherland served as associate professor chairperson in the Department of Health Education at the University of Maine at Farmington. She also played a key role during this period in the operations of the newly created Maine Health Education Resource Center and became one of the architects of the plan for a school health education program for the State of Maine.

In 1980, she moved to Florida State University, where she remained until her death. Dr Sutherland was the recipient in 1982 of the Joseph Y. Porter Award, the most prestigious recognition given to an individual by the Florida Public Health Association. In 1998, she became a Fellow of the American Academy of Health Behavior. That same year, she was honored by the American School Health Association for outstanding achievement in prevention research. She has twice (in 1992 and 1995) received a Secretary's Excellence Award for Health Promotion from the US Department of Health and Human Services. Several of her funded programs have been recognized officially by local and regional organizations for excellence in three different decades.
