= Mary Anne Raywid =

American education scholar and activist (1928 – 2010)

Mary Anne Raywid (1928–2010) was an education scholar, author, and activist. She is well known for her founding of the School Within a School movement and her advocacy for public education.

== Life and work ==
Mary Anne Raywid married Raymond Lewis Scheele and raised their son Scott in Long Island, NY. She spent 30 years here as a tenured professor at Hofstra University, teaching Educational Administration and Policy Studies, beginning in 1959. During this time she began to publish her written work on education, releasing over 300 works in her lifetime. Notably, her book The Ax Grinder (1963) addressed the criticism of public education and advocated for reform of the system rather than the creation of mass charter and private schools. She served as the president of the Society of Professors of Education from 1978–1979.

Raywid left Hofsta University of Long Island in 1996 to move to Honolulu, Hawaii, to care for her husband, until the end of his life. While there, she worked as an adjunct professor at University of Hawaii at Manoa, eventually chairing the League of Women Voters’ Education Committee, from 1998 until 2008. She continued her activism in Hawaii, helping to open small schools based around native Hawaiian culture.

Along with teaching at Hofsta University and the University of Hawaii, Raywid also stood on the advisory board of the Alternative Education Resource Organization (AERO), and worked with the John Dewey Society for Education and Culture, The American Educational Studies Association, and the Society of Professors of Education.

Mary Anne Raywid died suffering from lung and pancreatic cancer on January 12, 2010, after a two-year illness. She was 81.

== Philosophy ==
Mary Anne Raywid was an avid proponent of smaller schools with smaller class sizes. She believed that "The bigger the school, the more it loses its humanity." In Kapaa Elementary she helped to found the School-Within-A-School system, creating multiple small, focused institutions inside of one building. With lower populations in both classrooms and schools, she believed, teachers would be able to teach to individual student needs rather than the uniform education present in larger classrooms. Creating smaller schools would also address the problem Raywid saw in the shift from teacher control of the classroom to state mandates of what and how education is to be taught in public schools. Smaller schools, she believed, would give the decision of the pedagogy and focus of children’s education to their families.

Power dynamics and democratic education was another theme in Raywid's writing. In her essay "A Teachers Awesome Power", Raywid discusses the way that a teacher can shape the dynamics of their classroom. The way that a teacher interacts with their students, she writes, impacts the ways students can discuss their grievances and their feelings of wrongdoings occurring in the classroom. Self-esteem, also, is created through the ways that teachers talk to and interact with their students. Raywid urges teachers to “share the power” of the classroom with the students, rather than keeping strong classroom power to themselves.

== Mary Anne Raywid Award ==
Beginning in 1996, The Society of Professors of Education awards an individual who has "made outstanding contributions to the study of education." These individuals include researchers such as Maxine Greene (1996), Gloria Ladson-Billings (1997), Larry Cuban (1998), William Hare (1999), Herbert Kliebard (2000), Douglas J. Simpson (2001), Faustine Jones-Wilson (2002), O. L. Davis Jr. (2003), William Pinar (2004), Wayne Urban (2005), Geneva Gay (2006), William Schubert (2007), Daniel Tanner (2008), Joel Spring (2009), William H. Watkins (2011), Craig Kridel (2013), Edmund C. Short (2014), Janet L. Miller (2015), George Noblit (2016), Robert C. Morris (2017), Ming Fang He (2018), Pamela Konkol (2019), and Denise Taliaferro Baszile (2020).

== Limited bibliography ==
- The Ax-Grinders (1963)
- Pride and Promise: Schools of Excellence for All People (with Don Warren and Charlie Tesconi, 1984)
- Allan Saunders: The Man and His Legacy (with Esther Kwon Arinaga, 2000)
- Not So Easy Going: The Policy Environments of Small Urban Schools and Schools-Within-Schools (2003)
