= Mary Ann Venables =

British fencer

Personal information
- Born: Great Britain

Sport
- Sport: Fencing
Medal record
Women's fencing
Representing United Kingdom
World Championships
Bronze medal – third place	1930 Liège	Foil, individual

Mary Ann Venables (29 Sept 1902–11 Jun 1975) was a left-handed British fencer. She won a bronze medal in the individual foil event at the 1930 World Fencing Championships.

Venables studied engineering at St. Paul's Girls' School and went on to work for Sotheby's and the Royal Society of Medicine. A polyglot, she spoke French, German, Swedish, Norwegian, Danish, Russian, Italian, and Spanish. She used her language abilities to translate medical abstracts, articles, and books into English at the RSM.

She never married and lived in London with her father until his death in 1952, when she moved to Maiden Bradley, Wiltshire. She died in Salisbury in 1975.

== Fencing career ==
Venables tied for second place in the 1929 Hutton Cup. She took the bronze at the 1930 World Fencing Championships, behind Belgian Jenny Addams and Italian Germana Schwaiger. After being runner-up for two years, she won the Baptiste Bertrand Cup in 1930. That same year, she won the Desprez Fencing Cup; in 1931, she took third in the contest and second the following year. As part of the 1932 Bertrand team, she was runner-up in the Martin-Edmunds Inter-Salle Challenge Cup competition.

She was controversially left off the British women's team for the 1933 European Championships in Budapest.
