= Hugh Scott (architect) =

Irish architect

Hugh Jamieson Scott (1875–1930) was a Belfast-born architect who practised in Africa and Australia.

== Personal life ==
Scott was born at Elgin Terrace, Limestone Road, Belfast in 1875 to Northern Irish parents who later settled in East Orange, New Jersey in the United States. His father, John Alexander Scott, who was a businessman in the linen trade, died there in 1882 when Hugh was just seven. With his mother and six siblings he returned to live in Belfast where he was educated at Methodist College. After completing his articles in Belfast and Liverpool, he moved to Southern Africa in 1896. Following his marriage in Johannesburg in 1906 to Madeleine Caldecott, he and his new wife sailed for Australia in late 1907. With their first daughter, who was born on the voyage, they settled in Armidale where Scott conducted a sole practice. In 1914 he moved to Sydney where he was employed until 1916. He and his family (now including three daughters) then moved to Brisbane where his last child, another daughter, was born. Scott worked in Brisbane until a year before his death in 1930. Throughout his time in Africa and Australia, Scott was heavily involved in civic affairs including elected membership of local government councils.

== Career ==
Having finished his articles with Belfast builder Dixon & Co., Scott moved to Southern Africa in 1896 to undertake work associated with the Cape to Cairo railway. When, in 1903, a seven foot high granite Celtic cross designed by Scott was erected at the grave of Mother Patrick (Mary Anne Cosgrave) in Harare cemetery he was described as a "Salisbury Irishman" so, presumably, he lived in Harare at that time. The entry for Mother Patrick in the Dictionary of Irish Biography reveals that she was a pioneer Dominican who established the first hospital and European school - the Dominican Convent High School - in Harare. The original mortuary from her hospital is now a museum designated as Zimbabwe National Monument number 140. Unfortunately, Mother Patrick's memorial cross is the only known record of Scott's work in Africa. Around 1903, after involvement in the Boer War, Scott established an architectural practice in Middelburg, Mpumalanga (formerly Eastern Transvaal). During his time there he was a member of the Middelburg Town Council. With depressed conditions prevailing in Middelburg, Scott and his wife emigrated to Australia where he established his practice in Armidale in 1908. There he undertook a wide range of work including the design of hotels, shops, schools, station homesteads, town houses, public halls, and a church. Scott left Armidale in 1914 to work at the Commonwealth Naval Dockyard at Cockatoo Island, Sydney. In 1916 he moved with his family to Wynnum, an outer suburb of Brisbane where he obtained employment with the Queensland State Government Department of Works. Employed initially as a Temporary Draftsman he eventually became Senior Quantity Surveyor - a position he held until 1929 when ill health prompted his retirement. On 23 July 1921 Scott was elected as an Alderman of the Wynnum Town Council - the last such council before the 1924 amalgamation of councils to form the City of Brisbane. It appears that in 1921 Scott was the first of a handful of architects who successfully sought permission to bypass Workers' Dwelling Board architects so that they could design their own home to be built under the Workers' Dwelling Board's provisions for the owner to take out a mortgage from the state of Queensland.

== Practice in Armidale, New South Wales ==
During the six years of his practice in Armidale, Scott produced a large body of work, most of which was described in the local newspapers. His projects, numbering more than 45 in total, included: the design of two hotels and substantially remodelling three more; extensions to, and a mortuary building for the Armidale hospital; design of more than 12 residences in Armidale, Guyra, Uralla and other district towns; seven station homesteads; shops in Armidale and Guyra; schools in Armidale and Uralla; two Armidale public halls; two office blocks; the stewards’ stand and tea-room at the Armidale Race Course; a church; a produce store; and a shearing shed. Scott's only known collaboration with another architect was when he joined with Jack Hennessy of Sydney to design St Mary's School in Armidale's Catholic Cathedral precinct. Already a member of the Royal Society of Arts, London and of the Architectural Association, London, the initials for both of which he used as post nominals, Scott was honoured with admission as Fellow of the newly created Institute of Architects of New South Wales (FIA) in 1912.

== Architectural style ==
Consistent with the custom of the time for a small architectural practice in a rural community, Scott produced a wide range of work using a variety of styles and materials. While most of his larger structures were of brick, timber was the material of choice for many of his domestic-scale designs. Today, most of his work would be described as being in the Federation style.

Much of Scott's work featured an eclectic mix of late Victorian detail applied to asymmetric structures – some with more brutal Edwardian form. His work was not adventurous – in the sense that he largely ignored Arts and Crafts influences and the bolder Federation statements such as are often seen in the Queen Anne style. Like the work of many immigrant architects his buildings would have been seen as fitting in easily with the existing building stock at the time. It is probable that his knowledge of South African colonial architecture would have stood him in good stead in creating designs suited to Armidale.

== Legacy ==
Although many commercial buildings have been demolished, most of the Armidale and district buildings Scott designed are standing today, as is Mother Patrick's monument in Harare. The survival of the Armidale works is testament to the effect of moderate population growth in preserving the built environment, and the respect that Armidale and district residents have for their heritage. A number of his buildings are heritage listed by local government.

== List of works ==
Apart from the Harare monument and the Wynnum house, each of the works listed below was described at least once in the Armidale and district press; for each work there is a reference to a publication and a date. Abbreviations: AC: Armidale Chronicle; AE&NEGA: Armidale Express and New England General Advertiser; FJ: Freeman’s Journal (Sydney); GA: Guyra Argus. More than 150 newspaper articles dealing with Scott have been tagged “Hugh Jamieson Scott” on Trove.

=== Works heritage listed by local government ===
- Methodist (now Uniting) Church, Maitland Street, Uralla. AE&NEGA 11/9/1908.
- Brick residence for W. G. Anderson, 49 Marsh Street, Armidale. AC 16/9/1908.
- Residence for Mr Alfred Perrott, “Chevy Chase” at Dangarsleigh near Armidale. AC 16/9/1908
- The Stewards’ stand and tea-room for the Armidale Jockey Club. (Now known as the Jockeys' Rooms.) AC 13/1/1909
- Extensive alterations and additions to the residence of Mr R. Pearson, Everett Street, Guyra. GA 29/10/1908.
- Imperial Hotel (now Thunderbolt Inn), Bridge Street, Uralla. AC 21/11/1908.
- Presbyterian Manse, Urandangie Street, Guyra. AC 16/10/09.
- Residence at Wandsworth for Mr S. H. McCrossan. AC 21/9/1910.
- Substantial demolition and rebuilding of Trim & Co. West End Stores, Crescent Street, Armidale. (Now known as Freeman House.) AE&NEGA 4/4/1911.
- Shops and refreshment rooms for Mr K. Cordato, 102 Bradley Street, Guyra. (Later known as Comino's.) AC 11/11/1911.
- St Joseph's Presbytery and School, 14 Bridge Street, Uralla. AE&NEGA 24/12/1912.
- Johnstone Memorial Hall, Faulkner Street, Armidale. AE&NEGA 24/12/1912.
- St Mary's Convent School, Cathedral Precinct, Armidale with Sydney architect Hennessy. AE&NEGA 24/12/1912.
- St Kilda Hotel, Rusden Street, Armidale (substantial renovations and additions). AE&NEGA 24/12/12.

=== Other works ===
- Granite cross decorated with a stylised orange tree erected in honour of Mother Patrick by the Mashonaland Irish Association in Harare cemetery, 1903.
- Cottages, Dumaresq Street, Armidale for Mr J. Gregory. AC 22/8/1908.
- Methodist parsonage, Hill Street, Uralla. AE&NGA 11/9/1908.
- House “Cintra” for Mr Whitby Simpson, Faulkner Street, Armidale. AC 16/9/1908.
- Offices in Faulkner Street, Armidale for C. Wilson & Co. and the New England Building Society. AC 31/10/1908. (Now much altered and known as 117 Faulkner Street.)
- Pearson residence, “Violet Hill”, Old Inverell Road, Armidale district. AC 5/12/1908.
- International Hotel, 140 Miller Street, Armidale. (Substantial alterations/renovations) AE&NEGA 29/1/1909. Demolished.
- A cottage on a portion of "Bally Glass", Aberfoyle for William Pearson. AC 30/1/1909.
- Mortuary building at Armidale Hospital. AE&NEGA 12/3/1909. Demolished.
- Residence for Mr P. Maguire, Puddledock. AC 10/4/1909.
- Residence for Mr James Attwater, Beardy Street, Armidale. AC 12/5/1909.
- Additions to Mr William Hiscox's property “Prosper”, Puddledock. AC 24/7/1909.
- Improvements and additions to Tattersall's Hotel, Beardy Street, Armidale. AC 24/7/1909.
- Five cottages for Mr J. Attwater, Beardy Street (East), Armidale. AC 24/7/1909.
- Alterations to Mr A. G. Spencer's shops, corner Beardy and Marsh streets, Armidale. AC 24/7/1909. Demolished.
- Demolition of Armidale showground building and re-erection for use as shearing shed at “Newholme” station for W. H. Warner. AC 31/7/1909.
- Three shops for Mr. A. G. Spencer on a vacant allotment opposite the Olympia Skating Rink, Armidale. AC 25/8/1909. Demolished.
- Ward extensions Armidale Hospital. AC 28/8/1909.
- Additions to the Caledonian Hotel, Beardy Street, Armidale. AC 25/9/1909. Demolished.
- Residence, “Coningdale”, Thalgarra. AC 25/9/1909.
- Alterations and extensive renovations to Armidale Town Hall. AC 20/4/1910.
- Erection of a produce store for Mr. J. Gregory. Unknown location. AC 24/8/1910.
- Ebor Hotel, Ebor. AE&NEGA 21/2/1911. Destroyed by fire.
- Alterations and additions to Miller's buildings, Beardy Street, Armidale for Mr George Nash. AE&NEGA 4/4/1911. Demolished.
- Residence for Mr J. Read “Glen Elm” (now known as “Douglas Park”), Puddledock. AE&NEGA 4/4/1911.
- Alterations to house “The Retreat”, Malpas Street, Guyra. GA 13/4/1911.
- Premises for Mr J. Kiefer, corner Marsh and Dumaresq Streets, Armidale. AC 15/6/1912. Demolished.
- Two story block of offices for C. G. Wilson, Beardy Street, Armidale. AE&NEGA 24/12/1912. Demolished.
- Arcadia Hall, Beardy Street, Armidale. AE&NEGA 24/12/1912. Demolished.
- Two blocks of shops, Guyra. AE&NEGA 24/12/1912.
- Additions and alterations to Catholic Bishop's house, Armidale. FJ 31/7/13.
- Arch, which bore the motto “Advance Armidale, 1863-1913”, commissioned by Council and erected in Beardy Street, Armidale as part of Jubilee Celebrations in 1913. AE&NEGA 2/11/1913.
- Scott's own family home at Moreton Avenue, Wynnum, c.1922.

== Gallery ==
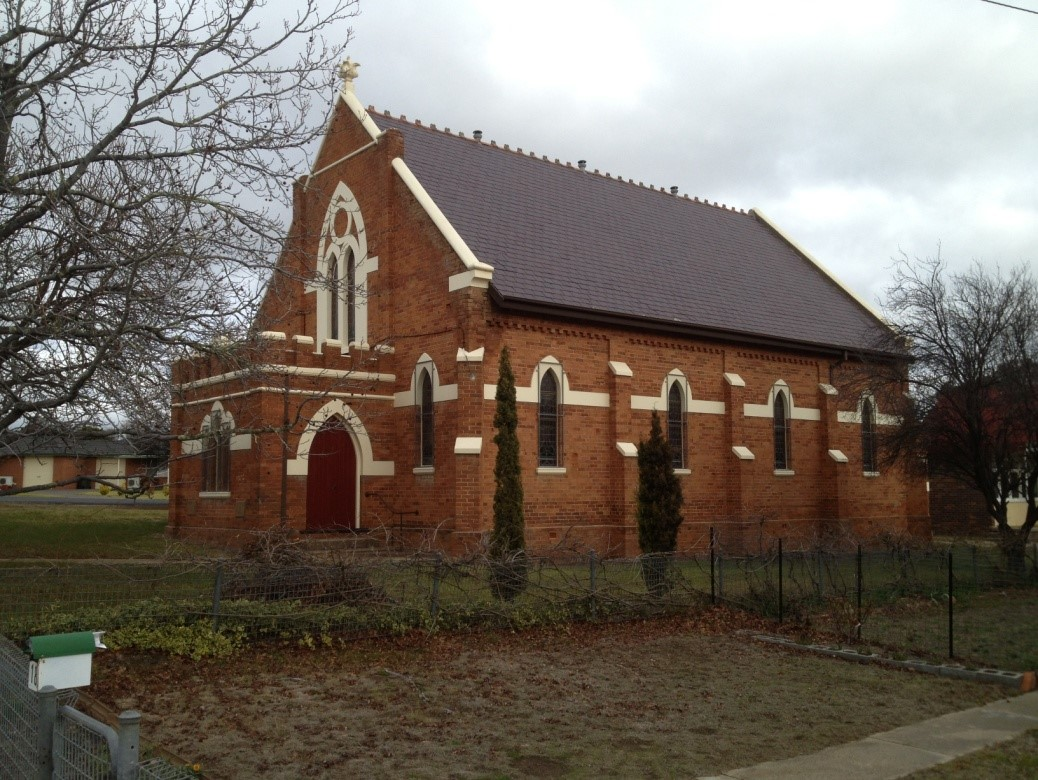
Methodist (now Uniting) Church Uralla 1908

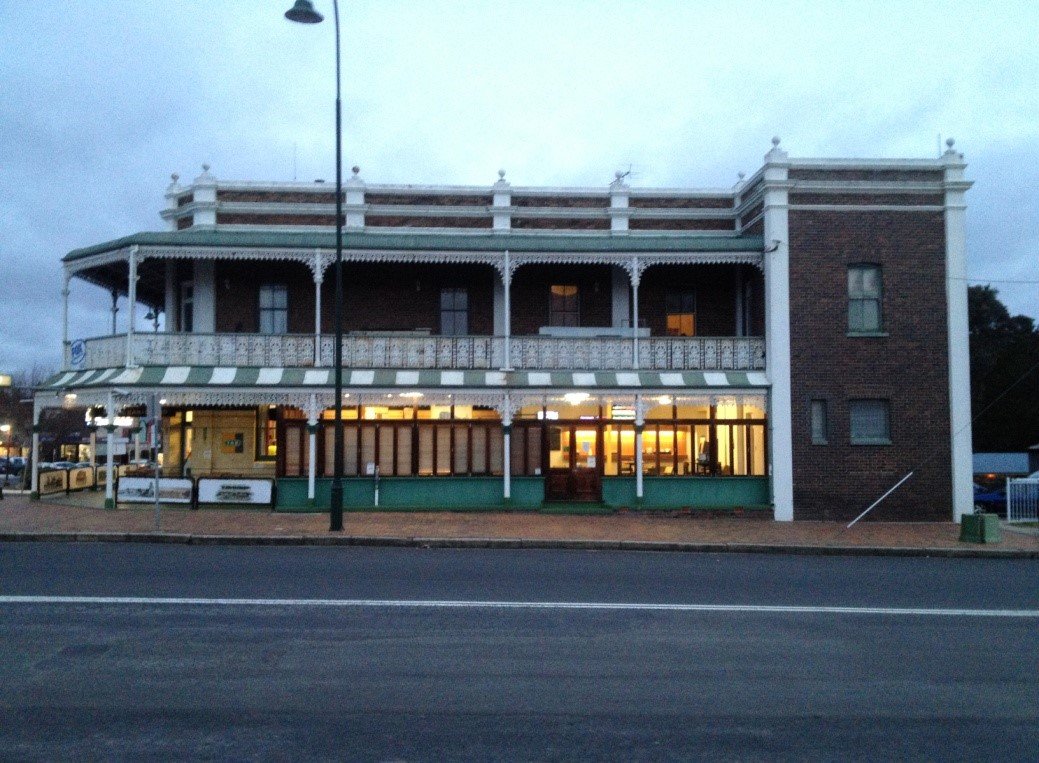
Imperial Hotel (now Thunderbolt Inn) Uralla 1909

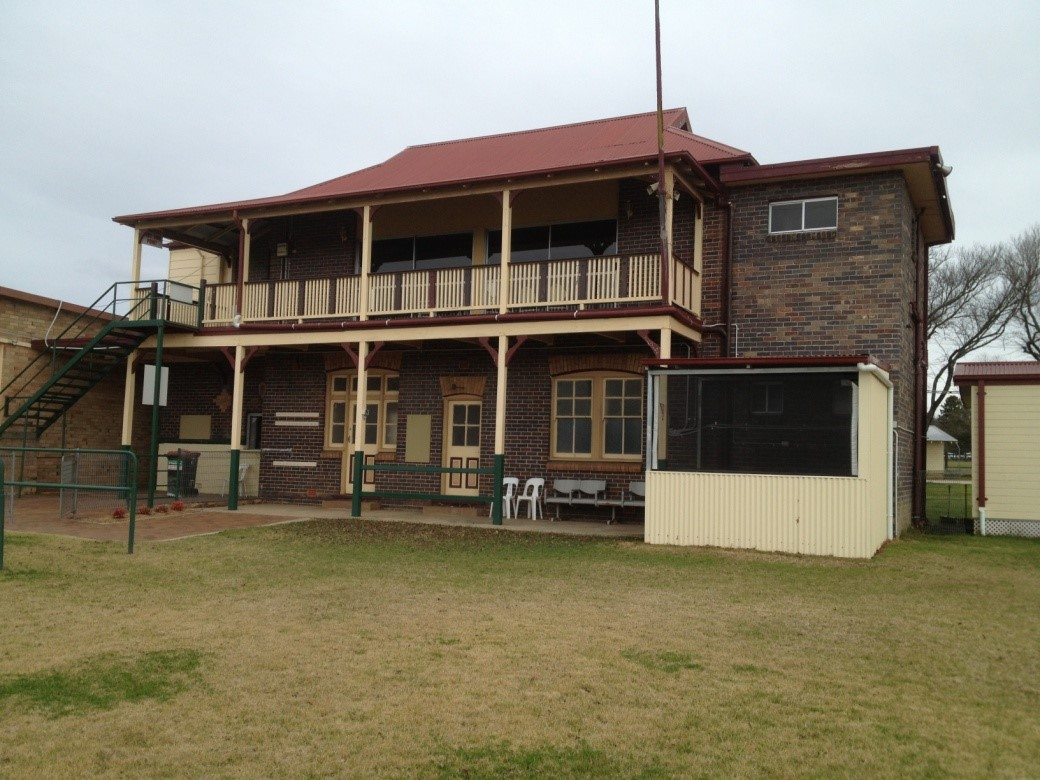
The Jockeys' Rooms at Armidale Racecourse 1909.

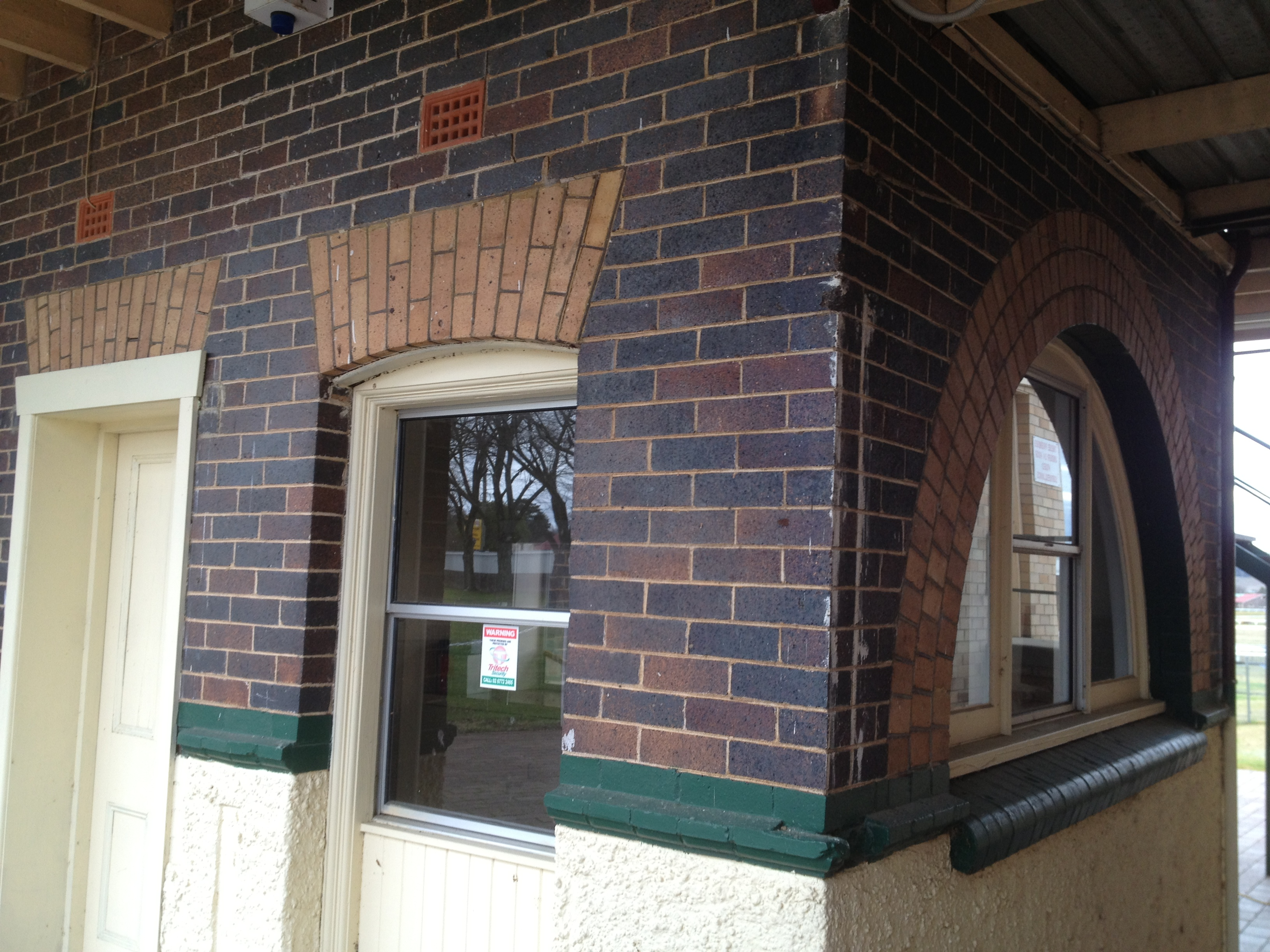
Jockeys' Rooms Armidale 1909 - detail

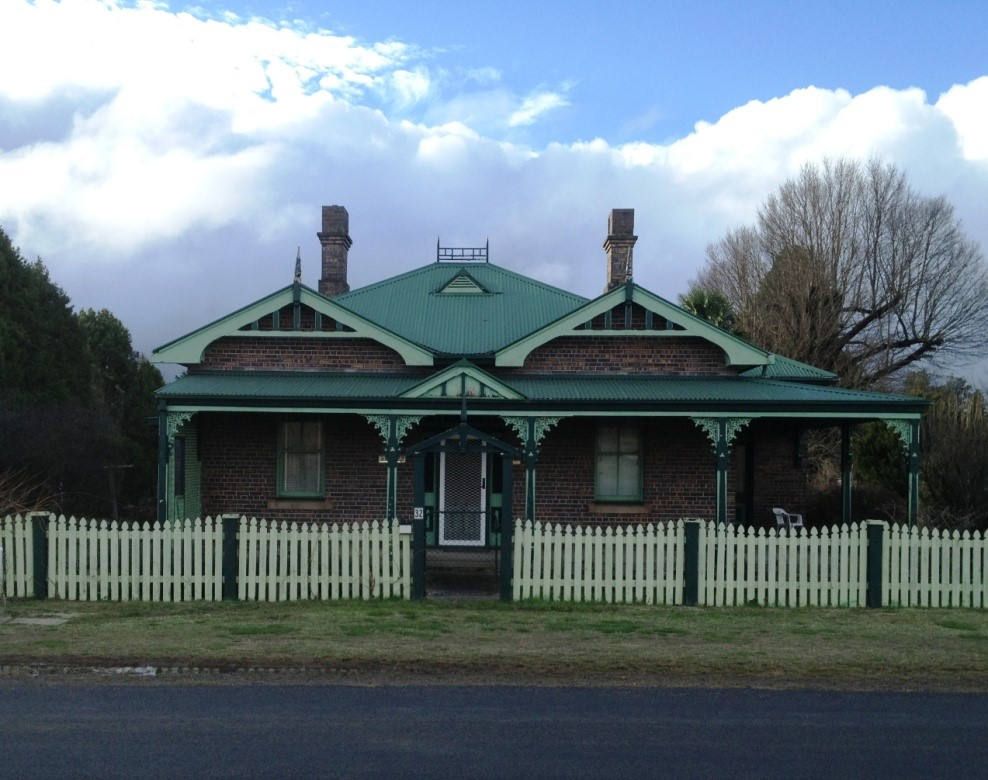
"Violet Hill" Armidale outskirts 1909

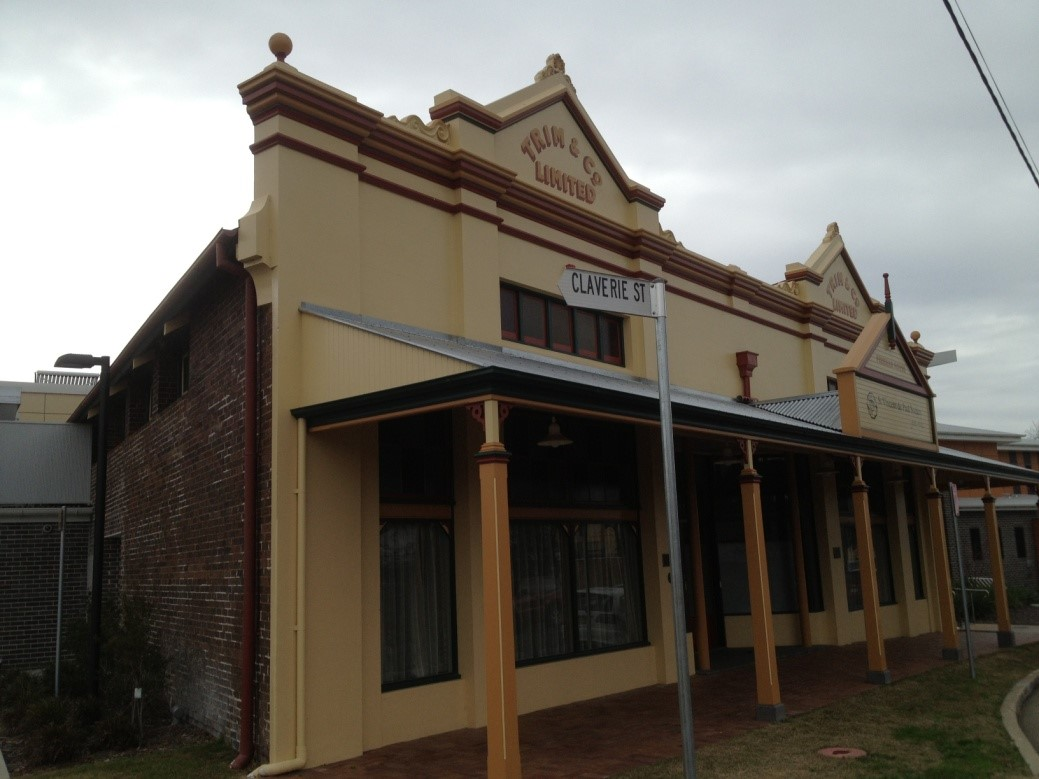
Trim and Co. Store Armidale 1911

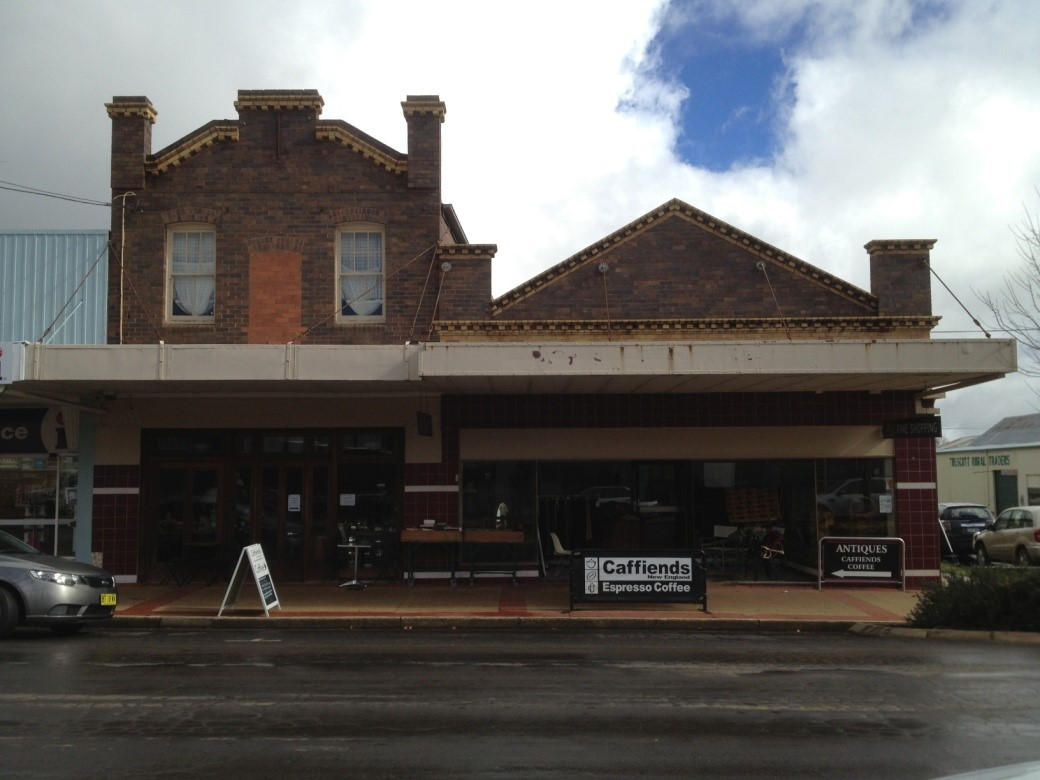
Cordatos's Store Guyra 1912
