= Mary Ann Sutherland =

New Zealand farmer and landowner

Mary Ann Sutherland (1864–1948) was a New Zealand farmer and landowner. She was born in Pirinoa, Wairarapa, New Zealand in 1864.
