= Mary Ann Cooke =

Mary Ann Cooke (1784–1868) was a British missionary and educator, active in Calcutta in India. In 1821, she became the first single female missionary to be sent from England to India, and founded a network of missionary girls' schools in Calcutta, which were famous as the first schools for girls in India, laying the foundation for modern female education in India.
