= Mary Ann Heacock =

American botanist (1915–2011)

Mary Ann Elizabeth Heacock (1915–2011), commonly known as Mary Ann Heacock, was an American avocational botanist who collected plants and inspired the work of many horticulturists and plant societies.

She was born on June 11, 1915 in Marthaville, Louisiana, and died on July 23, 2011 in Waurika, Oklahoma.

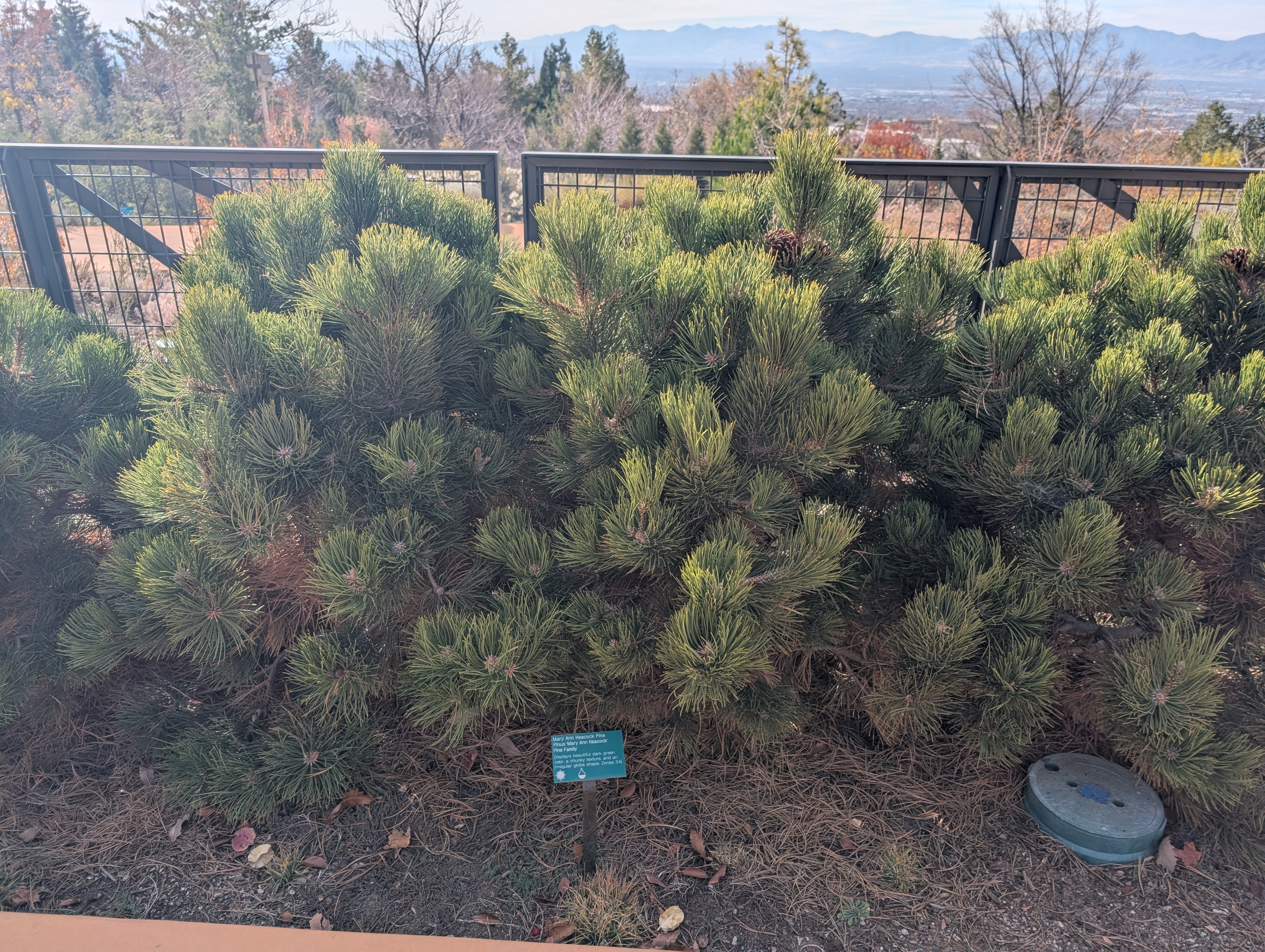
Mary Ann Heacock Pine

Some of the plant species and cultivars Heacock had a special role in identifying or developing include:

- Pinus ponderosa 'Mary Ann Heacock', a dwarf pine
- Opuntia debreczyi, a prickly pear
- Penstemon grandiflorus 'P010S', Prairie Jewel® penstemon
