= Mary Ann Croswell =

Silversmith who forged a George III toy rattle

- Died: 1830
- Occupation: Silversmith

Mary Ann Croswell (died 1830) was an English silversmith.

Croswell was the widow of smallworker Henry Croswell I, and registered her first mark on 21 May 1805, following with a second on 29 August 1816. A smallworker like her husband, she gave an address of 31 Monkwell Street in London. In October 1819 her son Henry Croswell became her apprentice. She may have been active as late as 1830; her will, in which the business was left to her son, was proved on 29 January that year. Other apprentices besides her son included Joseph Price and John Goodluck.

A George III toy rattle of silver and coral, dating to 1808 and attributed to Croswell, is in the collection of the National Museum of Women in the Arts.
