= Swedenborg Society =

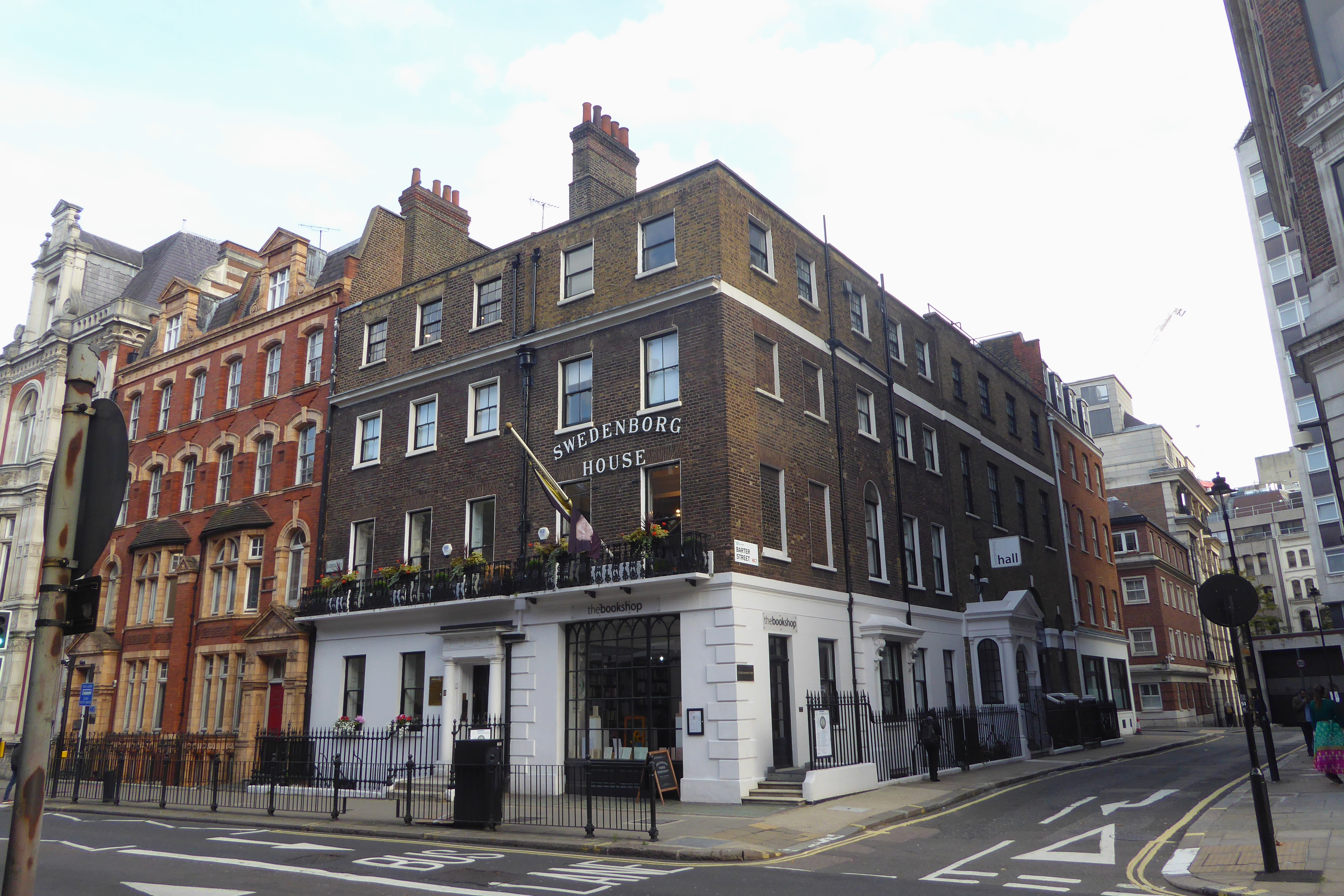
The Society's Headquarters in Bloomsbury Way, London

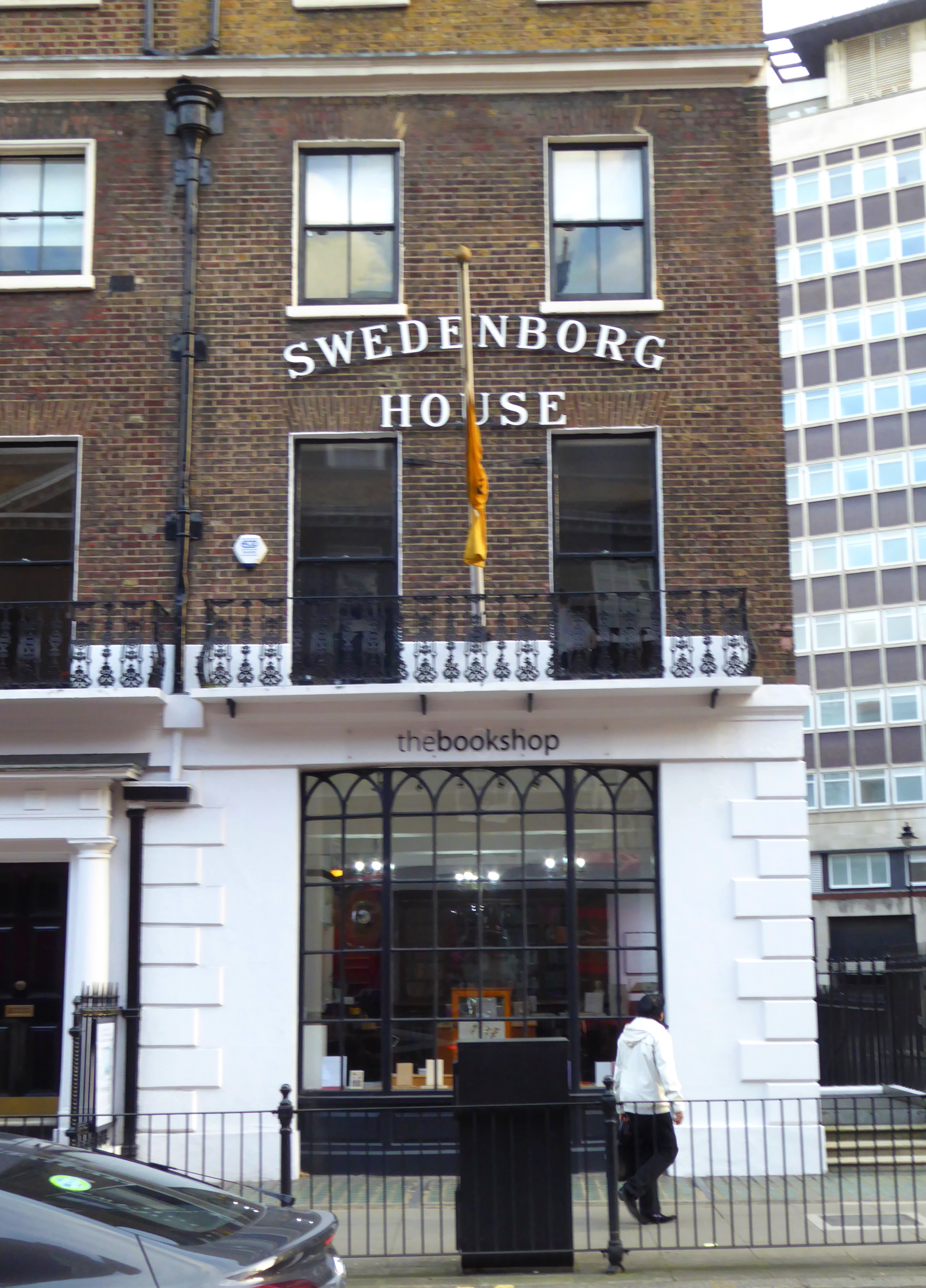

The Swedenborg Society was founded in 1810 to translate and publish the works of Emanuel Swedenborg in English. Its original name was the London Society for Printing and Publishing the Works of Emanuel Swedenborg.

The Society's headquarters, Swedenborg House, is a grade II listed building, built as a residence in about 1760 and acquired by the Society in 1925.
