= Matthew McIntyre-Wilson =

New Zealand jeweler (born 1973)

Matthew McIntyre-Wilson (born 1973 in Hastings, New Zealand) is a jeweller, weaver of accessories inspired by traditional Māori artefacts. He is a Ngā Mahanga and Titahi descent.

== Biography ==
In 1992, McIntyre-Wilson gained a certificate in Craft and Design from Whitireia Polytechnic, and a diploma in Visual Arts majoring in Jewellery from Hawke's Bay Polytechnic in 1996.

In 2008, the Museum of New Zealand Te Papa Tongarewa purchased the woven silver and copper tātua ("bum belts") that McIntyre-Wilson made after visiting their taonga Māori collection stores. McIntyre-Wilson also investigates the museum's archives in search of items labelled as "maker unknown", and document those items specifically.

== Work ==
The work of Matthew McIntyre-Wilson borrows from the techniques and styles of traditional Māori artefacts to create woven geometric patterns with copper, silver, gold, or stripped electrical wires. He combines his interest for raranga whakairo with his formal training in jewelry to make tātua ("bum belts"), arm bands, hinaki (eel pots) and brooches. His master weaver and mentor is Rangi Kiu (Ngāti Kahungunu ki Wairoa).

== Exhibitions ==
- 2008: Seven Stars at City Gallery Wellington
- 2009: New Threads: Contemporary Male Weaving at Objectspace Auckland
- 2012: Nga Mahana: The Twins at Fingers (gallery)
- 2014-2015: Matthew McIntyre Wilson & Maker Unknown at Pataka Art + Museum, the Māori Art Market, and the Spirit Wrestler Gallery in Vancouver, British Columbia.
