= Tātua =

Māori belt

The tātua is a traditional Māori belt which main purpose is to carry objects or arms. Several forms of tātua serve different functions.

== Etymology ==
"Tātua" is a Māori language word meaning "belt".

== Traditional use ==
Māori warriors were famously known for wearing only a maro (kilt) and a tātua during battle. Traditional tātua are made of harakeke (flax) and used to carry tools or weapons. A tātua sits across the abdomen and can be passed on from generation to generation.

Tātua kotara are broad plaited belts used as a defence against spears in the period before a mortal combat.

== See also ==
- Māori traditional textiles
- Matthew McIntyre-Wilson (contemporary weaver of tātua)
