= 1810 in New Zealand =

- Decades: 1800s; 1810s; 1820s; 1830s
- See also: History of New Zealand; List of years in New Zealand; Timeline of New Zealand history

There is a drastic decline in the number of ships visiting New Zealand from the previous year. An economic depression starts in New South Wales as a result of the escalation of war in Europe and the consequent reduction in the number of convicts being transported. In March news of the Boyd massacre reaches Port Jackson and a punitive expedition is sent to New Zealand and bombards the village of the incorrectly blamed chief, Te Pahi. After this the few whaling ships (possibly only five) that later head for New Zealand usually prefer to avoid landing, especially in the Bay of Islands.

Sealing in Foveaux Strait declines as the rookeries are exhausted. With the discovery of Campbell Island at the beginning of the year, and Macquarie Island in the middle of the year, by the same sealing ship, sealers transfer their attention there. If they stop off in New Zealand it is usually in Foveaux Strait.

== Incumbents ==
=== Regal and viceregal ===
- Head of State – King George III.
- Governor of New South Wales – Lachlan Macquarie, having arrived 4 days earlier, is sworn in on New Year's Day.

== Events ==
- 1 January – Lachlan Macquarie is sworn in as Governor of New South Wales.
- 2 January – Active (first ship of the name), Captain John Bader, arrives at Open Bay Islands off the south West Coast.
- 4 January – The sealing ship Perseverance, Captain Hasselberg, discovers Campbell Island.
- 6 January – Boyd massacre: Captain Berry, of the City of Edinburgh, drafts a letter to Governor Macquaruie, which blames the Boyd massacre on chief Te Pahi. He leaves this letter, and copies of a notice warning visiting ships of what has happened, with chief Tara. The City of Edinburgh then leaves for Valparaíso with the four survivors of the Boyd.
- 10 January – The sealer Sydney Cove, Captain Charles McLaren, lands a sealing gang on Stewart Island.
- Late January – The Cumberland, Captain William Swain, visits the Bay of Islands and is given a copy of Captain Berry's notice.
- Mid February – The Ann, and the Albion, Captain Cuthbert Richardson, visit the Bay of Islands and are shown Captain Berry's notice.
- 16 February – Active leaves a sealing gang on one of the Open Bay Islands and sets sail for Sydney. The ship is never seen again. The sealing gang is not rescued until 1813.
- 18 February – The Ann and Albion leave the Bay of Islands.
- 19 February – The Ann and Albion meet the King George, Captain Samuel Chace and inform Captain Chace of the burning of the Boyd.
- 28 February – The convict ship Ann (second ship of the name), Captain Charles Clarke, arrives in Port Jackson with Samuel Marsden, William Hall, John King, and Ruatara. Ruatara stays with Marsden twice over the next 18 months, his attempt to reach New Zealand having failed. The news of the Boyd massacre delays Marsden's plans for a mission in New Zealand until 1814.
- 2 March – The Brothers leaves Port Jackson for Open Bay.
- 9 March – The King George arrives in Port Jackson and is the first to report the loss of the Boyd.
- 17 March – The Experiment, Captain Joseph Dodds, leaves Port Jackson taking a party headed by William Leith to set up a flax-collecting settlement in the North Island. Also on board is Lieutenant-Governor Joseph Foveaux.
- 26 March – Five ships, having heard the story of the Boyd from a local woman, attack Te Pahi's pa on Rangihoua Bay. About 60 Māori are killed and Te Pahi is wounded (he dies a few weeks later). The ships involved are the Speke (John Hingston), Inspector (John Walker), Diana (William Parker), Atalanta (John Morris) and Perseveance (Frederick Hasselberg). Later the same day, after the attack, the Spring Grove and New Zealander arrive. Phillip Tapsell is among the crew on the latter.
- 27 March – The Governor Bligh, Captain Chace, leaves Port Jackson with supplies for the Experiment. When it is discovered that the Leith party has already returned to Port Jackson Captain Chace decides to return via Foveaux Strait, where it collects (around June) the sealing gang left by the Fox in October 1809.
- 3 May – The Brothers collects two men it had dropped in 1809 on islands on what is now the Dunedin coast at Port Daniel (Otago Harbour), including William Tucker. Tucker is sent to look for other sealers from the Brothers at Stewart Island. It is probably at this time, on the shores of Foveaux Strait, that he steals the Māori preserved head that he later sells in Sydney, thus inaugurating the retail trade of such items.
- 11 July – The Perseverance discovers Macquarie Island.
- 15 August – The Unity returns to Port Jackson from the south coast of New Zealand and describes the local Māori there as "particularly friendly".
- November/December – The Sydney Cove, Captain Charles McLaren, anchors in Otago Harbour. The theft of a red shirt and other articles by local chief Te Wahia sparks what becomes known as the Sealers' War or the War of the Shirt, which lasts until 1823. One of her sealers kills Te Wahia which incenses Māori. The Sydney Cove flees south and one of her crew, James Caddell, is captured by Māori at the Clutha mouth.

Undated

- Te Rauparaha begins a five-year stay with Ngāti Maru in the Hauraki Gulf. His intentions may have been to form alliances to attack his enemies in the Waikato and/or to find somewhere to resettle Ngāti Toa should Kawhia become too unsafe.

== Births ==
- 24 February: (in England): William Mason, architect.
- 3 July (in England):Hugh Carleton, politician.
- 4 August: John Richardson, politician.
- 15 August (in England): William Fitzherbert, politician.

Undated

- (in England):George Arney, chief justice.
- Thomas Beckham, politician
- (in England):Thomas Henderson, politician.
- (in Ireland): Alfred Ludlam, politician.
- (in England):William Wells, politician.

== Deaths ==
- Te Pahi, Ngāpuhi leader

== See also ==
- History of New Zealand
- List of years in New Zealand
- Military history of New Zealand
- Timeline of New Zealand history
- Timeline of New Zealand's links with Antarctica
- Timeline of the New Zealand environment
