= 1813 in New Zealand =

- Decades: 1800s; 1810s; 1820s; 1830s
- See also: Other events of 1813; Timeline of New Zealand history

By the end of the year reports from London regarding Napoleon's retreat from Moscow, and from the Bay of Islands regarding the hospitality of the Māori, encourage Samuel Marsden into thinking the time for the establishment of a Christian mission to New Zealand is now imminent.

Whaling ships are a regular occurrence off the coasts of New Zealand, usually calling into the Bay of Islands. A number have Māori among their crew. Sealing ships operate in both Bass Strait and Macquarie Island, occasionally calling into New Zealand. A few have Māori among their crew.

== Incumbents ==
=== Regal and viceregal ===
- Head of State – King George III. With Prince George, Prince of Wales as prince regent.
- Governor of New South Wales – Lachlan Macquarie

== Events ==
- 19 April – The Perseverance, leaves Sydney looking for flax trading possibilities in the south of the South Island. During the trip she is the first ship known to have entered Bluff Harbour.
- 2 May – The Perseverance collects the sealing gang left on Solander Island in western Foveaux Strait in 1809 by the Fox.
- May – After waiting for nearly 5 years Thomas Kendall and his family finally depart England for New Zealand (via New South Wales).
- 20 July – The Perseverance returns to Sydney.
- October – Reverend Marsden's plans for a mission in New Zealand come a step closer with the arrival of Thomas Kendall at Port Jackson.
- 27 November – The Governor Bligh Captain John Grono, collects the sealing gang left marooned on the Open Bay islands off the south West Coast since 1810 by the loss of their ship Active (first vessel of that name).
- 16 December – The Governor Bligh returns to Port Jackson.

Undated

- Early in the year Ruatara is finally returned home. With the death during his absence of Te Pahi and his elder brother, Ruatara is made paramount chief of Ngā Puhi. He has seed wheat given to him by Samuel Marsden and intends to grow it to sell to Europeans. He does not however have anything to grind the wheat with. (see 1814)

1813 or 1814

- 6 lascars from the Matilda desert the ship at 'Port Daniel'(Otago Harbour). One later takes the moko and is still living with Māori on Stewart Island in 1844.
- Robert Brown and 7 others of the Matilda sail from Stewart Island in a ship's boat to search the east coast of the South Island as far as Moeraki and Oamaru looking for the missing lascars. They are all killed and, presumably, eaten.

== Births ==
- 1 January (in England): Charles Clifford, politician.
- 30 January (in England): William Charles Cotton, missionary.
- 27 March (in Scotland): David Monro, politician.
- 2 June (in Ireland): Daniel Pollen, 9th premier of New Zealand.
- 14 November (in England): Joseph Hawdon, landowner.

undated

- Henry Blundell, newspaper publisher
- Isaac Featherston, politician.

approximate

- Mete Kīngi Paetahi, politician.

== See also ==
- History of New Zealand
- List of years in New Zealand
- Military history of New Zealand
- Timeline of New Zealand history
- Timeline of New Zealand's links with Antarctica
- Timeline of the New Zealand environment
