= Prior to 1800 in New Zealand =

- Years in New Zealand from 1800 onwards
- 1800 | 1801 | 1802 | 1803 | 1804 | 1805 | 1806

The first humans are thought to have arrived in New Zealand from Polynesia some time around 1300 AD. The people, who later became known as Māori, eventually travelled to almost every part of the country. Their arrival had a significant impact on the local fauna, particularly the flightless birds such as moa.

The first recorded sighting of New Zealand by a European was by a crew-member of Abel Tasman's ship in 1642, although no landing took place. Some of the crew were killed in Golden Bay and there was no other contact with local Māori. Tasman only visited and mapped the north and north-west coast of the South Island and part of the west coast of the North Island and remained unaware of the insularity of New Zealand.

The next known visit by Europeans was in 1769 when James Cook arrived. Cook circumnavigated the country mapping the majority of both islands and making only two erroneous assumptions, Banks Island (Peninsula) and South Cape (Stewart Island). Cook had numerous meetings with Māori, helped by having aboard a Tahitian, Tupaia, whose language has many similarities with te reo Māori. Cook returned in 1773 and late 1774, and on his third voyage in 1777. Although relations with Māori were generally friendly, albeit with misunderstandings on both sides, on one occasion a number of his crew were killed and eaten.

In 1769, around the same time that Cook made his first visit, Jean de Surville also briefly visited New Zealand. Surville's encounters with Māori began amiably but ended badly, culminating with burning 30 huts and kidnapping a chief on his departure.

A few years later another Frenchman, Marion du Fresne, arrived. His visit also ended badly as du Fresne and some of his crew were killed and the remaining crew retaliated by killing a considerable number of Māori.

There were no more recorded visits for 20 years, although vessels unlicensed by the East India Company may have been deliberately vague about any activities in New Zealand waters. In the 1790s there were visits by scientists/explorers, sealers, flax/timber collectors and whalers. By 1800 the first foreign settlers were living in New Zealand, and Māori had begun to leave and return, upon which they shared their experiences of lands and people from other countries.

== Incumbents ==
=== Regal and vice-regal ===
Any reference to New Zealand in a legal rather than geographic sense before 1840 is complex and unclear. When the British colony of New South Wales was founded in 1788 it nominally included a claim to New Zealand as far as 43°39'S (approximately halfway down the South Island). In the years before 1800 there was little interest shown by European powers in New Zealand except for the events of 1793 (see below).

- Head of State – King George III
- Governors of New South Wales
1. 23 January 1788 - 10 December 1792 - Captain Arthur Phillip RN
2. 11 September 1795 - 27 September 1800 - Captain John Hunter RN

=== Indigenous ===
Each hapū or iwi had its own recognised leaders in the form of Rangatira (chiefs) or Ariki (nobles).

== Events ==
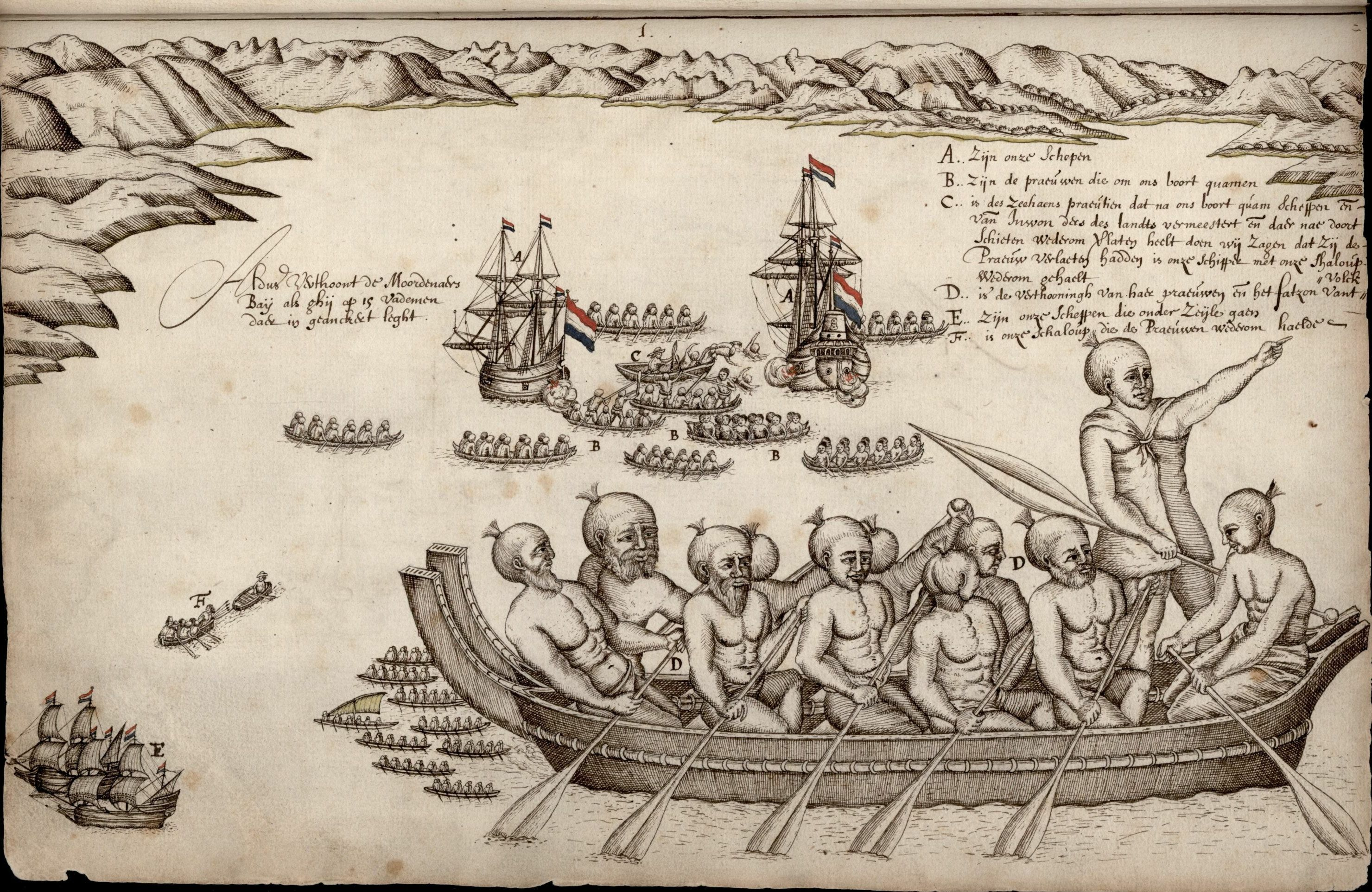
The meeting between Abel Tasman's crew and a Ngāti Tūmatakōkiri war party in Golden Bay / Mohua (1642).

=== 1300 ===
- Approximate date of the arrival of Māori in New Zealand.
- Settlement at the Wairau Bar.

=== circa 1500 ===
- Moa are hunted to extinction.
- the Chatham Islands are discovered and settled.

=== 1642 ===
- 13 December – Dutch explorer Abel Tasman sights the South Island. Initially he calls it Staten Landt but the following year this is changed to Nieuw Zeeland.
- 18 December – Abel Tasman's expedition sails around Farewell Spit and into Golden Bay. The next day four of Tasman's crew and several members of a Ngāti Tūmatakōkiri war party die in a skirmish resulting in Tasman naming the bay Murderer's Bay.

=== 1643 ===
- 6 January – Tasman discovers and names the Three Kings Islands and then departs New Zealand waters.

=== 1768 ===
- 26 August – First voyage of James Cook departs England on HMS Endeavour.

=== 1769 ===
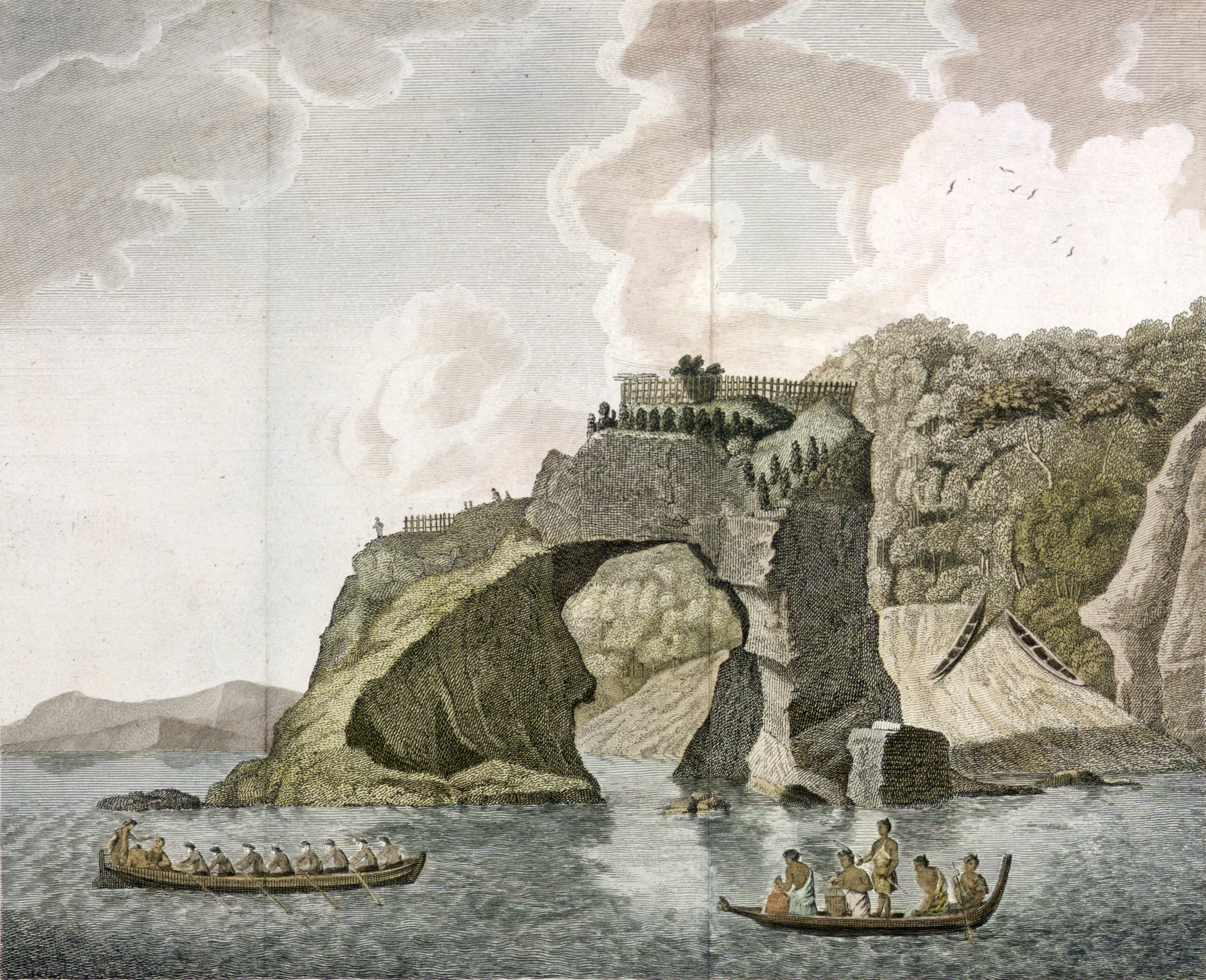
A view of Te Puta o te Paretauhinau Pā in Mercury Bay, seen during the first voyage of James Cook (1769)

- 6 October – Land sighted by the crew of Endeavour. Young Nick's Head is named after Nicholas Young.
- 12 December – Jean-François-Marie de Surville in St Jean Baptiste sights the coastline of New Zealand.
- 25 December – The first Christian service in New Zealand is conducted in Doubtless Bay by Father Paul-Antoine Léonard de Villefeix of the de Surville expedition.
- 31 December – de Surville and St Jean Baptiste depart Doubtless Bay for South America.

=== 1770 ===
- 1 April – Cook's first voyage departs New Zealand and heads towards Australia.

=== 1772 ===
- 25 March – Marc-Joseph Marion du Fresne in Mascarin and the Marquis de Castries sights Mount Taranaki.
- 12 June – Du Fresne and 26 of his crew killed and eaten by Māori warriors. In retaliation, the French burn down a village named Paeroa, killing 250 Māori.

=== 1773 ===
- 30 April – Cook arrives in Dusky Sound on his second voyage to New Zealand in HMS Resolution.
- 7 May – The second ship on Cook's expedition, HMS Adventure under Tobias Furneaux, arrives in Queen Charlotte Sound.
- 17 May – The Resolution joins the Adventure at Queen Charlotte Sound.

=== 1774 ===
- 14 July – HMS Adventure returns to England.

=== 1775 ===
- 30 July – HMS Resolution returns to England ending Cook's second voyage.

=== 1777 ===
- 12 February – James Cook arrives at Queen Charlotte Sound in HMS Resolution and HMS Discovery on his third voyage.
- 26 February – Cook's final departure from New Zealand.

=== 1791 ===
- 2 – 22 November – Vancouver Expedition in HMS Discovery and HMS Chatham visits Dusky Sound.
- 19 December – The whaling ship William and Ann, under the command of Eber Bunker, leaves Norfolk Island with instructions from Governor King to procure two "Natives" to teach the Norfolk Island convicts flax dressing. Although the William and Ann reaches Doubtless Bay early the following year they are unable to prevail upon any Māori to accompany them.

=== 1792 ===
- 6 November – The Britannia, under the command of Captain William Raven, arrives at Dusky Sound from Port Jackson to drop off a sealing party. This is the first sealing gang to be landed in New Zealand.
- 1 December – The Britannia leaves for to the Cape of Good Hope via Cape Horn. During its stay the crew have built several buildings, the first European buildings in New Zealand. On one occasion they sight some Māori who run away. Māori are not sighted in the area by any of the subsequent sealers who visit Dusky Sound in the next 20 years. The sealing party is left with tools and equipment to build a small ship. They are the first Europeans to stay in New Zealand.

=== 1793 ===
- 25 February – The Malaspina Expedition, under Alessandro Malaspina, arrives in Dusky Sound.
- c. March/April – The Daedalus, Lieutenant James Hanson, anchors off the Cavalli Islands. Hanson has instructions to find 2 Māori to take to Norfolk Island to instruct the convicts in the production of flax. He kidnaps Tuki(-tahua) and Huru(-kokoti) who are not only men (flax weaving is done by women) but also high-born.
- 20 April – The Daedalus arrives in Port Jackson.
- 24 April – Tuki and Huru are transferred to the Shaw Hormuzear, Captain William Wright Bampton, which leaves for Norfolk Island where it arrives before the end of the month.
- May – Having discovered that Tuki and Huru know virtually nothing about flax production Commandant King offers them the choice of leaving on the Shaw Hormuzear for England or staying on the island until they can be returned home. They choose to stay.
- 8 September – The Britannia and the Francis, Captain House, leave Port Jackson to collect the sealing party at Dusky Sound.
- 27 September – The Britannia arrives at Dusky.
- Approximately 11 October – The Francis arrives at Dusky.
- 20 October – The Britannia and Francis leave for Norfolk Island.
- 2 November – The Britannia and Francis arrive at Norfolk Island. Captain Raven reports enthusiastically about the prospects of settlement in New Zealand. Lieutenant-Governor King commandeers the Britannia to return Tuki and Huru. The Francis returns to Port Jackson where Captain House reports somewhat less than enthusiastically to Acting Governor Grose about New Zealand.
- 9 November – The Britannia leaves for New Zealand. During their stay King has learned much about New Zealand from Tuki and Huru, including a map of the country drawn by Tuki and some of the language. He draws up plans for settling New Zealand of which he hopes to be in charge.
- 12 November – The Britannia arrives at Muriwhenua (North Cape). After greeting the local Māori, including relatives of Tuki, the Britannia attempts to sail for the Bay of Islands but is becalmed.
- 13 November – The Britannia leaves North Cape to return to Norfolk Island. King leaves gives gifts to Tuki and Huru including clothing, tools, potatoes and pigs. The latter 2 are the first in this part of New Zealand.

=== 1794 ===
- 10 March – Samuel Marsden arrives at Sydney to become the assistant chaplain to Reverend Richard Johnson.
- 4 July – Marsden moves to Parramatta.
- October – Marsden buys 100 acres and starts his farm which is worked by convict labour.
- 12 – 14 November – The Fancy, Captain Thomas Dell, visits Doubtless Bay in Northland. Captain Dell passes a message from Lieutenant-Governor King to Tuki (see 1793 above).
- 20 November – The Fancy arrives in Hauraki to collect spars and flax.

=== 1795 ===
- 21 February – The Fancy leaves Hauraki having felled far more timber than she can carry away. She also has a large quantity of dressed flax.
- 18 September – The Endeavour, Captain William Brampton, and the Fancy, Captain Dell, leave Port Jackson. There are fifty passengers (mostly freed convicts) aboard, including Elizabeth Heatherly (a.k.a. Bason) and her partner James Heatherly and their small son James. The ships plan to visit Dusky Sound and Norfolk Island en route to India. Shortly after leaving they discover 40 escaped convicts and deserters aboard (including 1 female, Ann Carey).
- Before 12 October – The Endeavour and Fancy arrive at Dusky. Elizabeth Heatherly and Ann Carey are the first pakeha women known to have visited New Zealand. There are in all 244 people on the 2 vessels. Captain Brampton intends to hunt seals, finish the schooner left by the Britannia (see above) and load spars for Bombay. After a week the Endeavour is condemned as unseaworthy, it later is allowed to drift on to rocks and is beached. In addition to the unfinished boat left by the Britannia, to be known as the Providence, they decide to refit the Endeavour's longboat into another seaworthy vessel.
- Late in the year Samuel Marsden becomes a magistrate and the superintendent for government affairs.

=== 1796 ===
- 7 January – The Fancy and the Providence sail from Dusky Sound for Norfolk Island, where the passengers (including Elizabeth Heatherly and her son) and some seamen are left before carrying on to China. The convicts (including Ann Carey) and some ex-convicts (including shipwright James Heatherly) and seamen have been left at Dusky where they are still modifying the Endeavour's longboat into an ocean-going vessel.
- March – The Assistance (the Endeavour's longboat), having been made seaworthy (just), with a small crew of seamen and convicts, leaves Dusky for Norfolk Island. There are still 35 people left in Dusky.

=== 1797 ===
- May – The American snow Mercury, Captain William Barnett, rescues the remaining survivors of the Endeavour and takes them to Norfolk Island. During their time in Dusky no Māori have been sighted.

=== 1798 ===
- 20 August – The Hunter^{i}, Captain James Fearn, leaves Port Jackson for China. En route she collects spars from Hauraki (possibly in early October). Some of the spars may have been those left by the Fancy in 1795 (see above). The loading is assisted by local Māori but there is no other information about contact between the ship and the locals.

Undated

- Samuel Marsden first comes into contact with London Missionary Society missionaries from Tahiti and starts his interests in missionary activity in the islands of the Pacific.

=== 1799 ===
- 7 October – The Hunter^{ii}, Captain William Hingston, leaves Port Jackson for Calcutta. She stops at Hauraki to collect spars. Thomas Taylor and 3 other seaman (possibly all 4 were escaped convicts from New South Wales) leave the ship and stay with local Māori (they can possibly be considered the first Pākehā Māori). Taylor later marries a local woman and meets the crews of 2 ships that arrive in 1801. His later fate is unknown as is that of the other 3. The Hunter continues to Bengal where it is seized by the authorities and the ship's log is lost.

== Births ==
- 30 August 1790 – Richard Barton, first European resident of Trentham, Upper Hutt (d. 1866)
- c. 1790 – Te Mamaku, Māori chief (d. 1887)
- c. 1790 – Te Kani-a-Takirau, Māori chief (d. 1856)
- c. 1791 – Jeanie Collier, runholder (d. 1861)
- 20 March 1796 – Edward Gibbon Wakefield, coloniser (d. 1862)
- c. 1797/98 – Alexander Shepherd, second Colonial Treasurer (d. 1859)
- 27 February 1798 – Daniel Bell Wakefield, coloniser (d. 1858)
- c. 1798/99 – John Munro, politician (d. 1879)
- 19 November 1799 – Arthur Wakefield, coloniser (d. 1843)
- c. 1790s – Moka Te Kainga-mataa, Māori chief (d. 1860s)

== See also ==
- List of years in New Zealand
- Timeline of New Zealand history
- History of New Zealand
- Military history of New Zealand
- Timeline of the New Zealand environment
- Timeline of New Zealand's links with Antarctica

For world events and topics before 1800 not specifically related to New Zealand see specific years
