= 1807 in New Zealand =

- Decades: 1800s; 1810s; 1820s
- See also: History of New Zealand; List of years in New Zealand; Timeline of New Zealand history

There is a new sealing rush to the Bounty and Auckland Islands. Sealing also continues at Bass Strait and the Antipodes Islands. Foveaux Strait is a frequent stop for these sealing ships. Whaling continues off the east coast of the North Island. Ships are now visiting the Bay of Islands on a reasonably regular basis. The first reports about the poor behaviour of visiting ship's crew are sent to the Church Missionary Society in London.

== Incumbents ==
=== Regal and viceregal ===
- Head of State – King George III.
- Governor of New South Wales – William Bligh

== Events ==
- 10 February – Former Governor Philip Gidley King leaves New South Wales.
- February – Samuel Marsden is at last able to return to England where he intends to recruit members of the Church Missionary Society for a proposed mission in New Zealand.
- March – The Ferret calls at the Bay of Islands returning Te Mahanga from his trip to England.
- 30 March – 11 April – The Elizabeth, Captain William Stewart, calls at the Bay of Islands. On board is medical missionary George Warner who is horrified by the behaviour of the whaling crews and reports this to the Church Missionary Society.
- 17 April – The Richard and Mary, Captain Leikins arrives in England with (Maa-)Tara, son of Te Pahi, aboard. He meets Sir Joseph Banks.
- April – Governor Bligh issues a proclamation that South Sea Islanders (including Māori) are not to be taken to England and £20 bond is to be deposited for any that are brought into Port Jackson. This is ignored by most ship's captains.
  - – The Albion, Captain Cuthbert Robertson, visits the Bay of Islands after whaling off the coast. Ruatara is paid and leaves the ship.
  - – Catherine Hagerty, who had left the Venus the previous year, dies at the Bay of Islands.
- Late September/October – The Santa Anna, Captain William Moody, calls at the Bay of Islands. Ruatara joins the ship, still hoping to be able to travel to England to see King George III.
- October – The General Wellesley, Captain David Dalrymple, arrives in the Bay of Islands. George Bruce and his wife Te Atahoe (daughter of Te Pahi) go on board but are not returned to shore. The General Wellesley then heads for Penang via Fiji. After numerous deprivations George Bruce and Te Atahoe (aka Mary Bruce) are finally returned to Port Jackson in January 1810 where Mary dies shortly after.
- November – The Santa Anna drops a sealing gang, including Ruatara, at the Bounty Islands.

Undated

- Either this year or 1808 Charlotte Badger, from the Venus, is presumed to have left New Zealand, after at least twice refusing passage to Port Jackson. A woman fitting her description is sighted in Tonga nearly 10 years later.
- Captain Abraham Bristow returns to the Auckland Islands on the Sarah and formally claims them in the name of King George III. He also releases pigs on the islands.
- Either this year or early 1808, Ngāpuhi are defeated at the battle of Moremonui near Maunganui Bluff. Although armed with a few muskets the Ngā Puhi are ambushed by Murupaenga, leader of Ngāti Whātua, who successfully takes advantage of the time taken to reload the muskets. The fighting chief of Ngāpuhi, Pokaia, is killed as are two of Hongi Hika's brothers. After this Hongi becomes the war leader of Ngāpuhi.

== Births ==
- 28 March (in England): Joel Samuel Polack, first Jewish settler in New Zealand, brewer, businessman
- 3 July (in England): Thomas Gore Browne, 4th Governor of New Zealand
- 7 September (in England): Henry Sewell, first Premier of New Zealand
- 1 November (in England): James George Deck, Brethren evangelist
- 30 November (in England): Felix Wakefield, colonist

undated

- Dicky Barrett, trader and first European settler in Taranaki
- (in England): William Martin, First Chief Justice of New Zealand

approximate

- Hone Heke, Māori rangatira
- Samuel Revans, newspaper entrepreneur, politician
- (in England): William Barnard Rhodes, businessman, pastoralist and politician

== Deaths ==
undated

- Pokaia, Ngāpuhi chief

== See also ==
- History of New Zealand
- List of years in New Zealand
- Military history of New Zealand
- Timeline of New Zealand history
- Timeline of New Zealand's links with Antarctica
- Timeline of the New Zealand environment
