= 1808 in New Zealand =

- Decades: 1800s; 1810s; 1820s
- See also: History of New Zealand; List of years in New Zealand; Timeline of New Zealand history

As sealing at Bass Strait and the Antipodes Islands declines, Foveaux Strait becomes the focus for sealers from the middle of the year. The Bounty and Auckland Islands are also visited. Whaling is carried out on the east coast of New Zealand with the Bay of Islands being the usual port of call for provisioning. As many as nine ships whaling together for months at a time can occur. The behaviour of the whalers at the Bay of Islands is again commented on unfavourably, this time by a former missionary on one of the whaling ships. There are also a number of vessels collecting sandalwood from Tonga or Fiji; the majority call at the Bay of Islands en route.

The administration in New South Wales is beginning to be seen by some Māori chiefs as the authority to whom to appeal to in cases of some activities by the crews of visiting ships. Some are also boarding vessels to visit New South Wales and England and are also taken to various Pacific Islands.

== Incumbents ==
=== Regal and viceregal ===
- Head of State – King George III.
- Governor of New South Wales – On 26 January Governor Bligh is placed under house arrest as part of the Rum Rebellion by the New South Wales Corps and remains there for the rest of the year. Lieutenant-Governor Joseph Foveaux returns to New South Wales from England on 28 July and assumes control until the end of the year.

== Events ==
- May – The last sighting of the pirated ship Venus off the east coast of the North Island.
- Late May/June – Te Pahi, with three of his sons, travels to Port Jackson on the Commerce to complain to Governor of New South Wales Bligh about the kidnapping of his daughter and her husband by Captain Dalrymple.
- May(?) – The schooner Parramatta, Captain John Glenn, calls at the Bay of Islands in distress. When local Māori ask for payment for the food they have supplied to the ship they are thrown overboard and fired upon. On leaving the Bay the ship is wrecked on rocks near Cape Brett. All the crew are killed and the ship plundered.
- 10 July – The Commerce arrives in Port Jackson. Te Pahi arrives ill and is unable to meet Governor Bligh formally in any case as the latter is under house arrest.
- 26 September – Te Pahi returns to the Bay of Islands on the Commerce.
- September/October – The King George, Captain Richard Siddons, visits the Bounty Islands and finds the sealing gang, including Ruatara, left there by the Santa Anna the previous year. 3 of the gang have died from hunger and thirst. The King George provides some provisions.
- October – Several weeks after the King George leaves the Santa Anna returns to collect the sealing gang. Ruatara decides to stay with the ship for its return to England as he wants to meet King George III.

Undated

- Either 1807 or this year Charlotte Badger, from the Venus, is presumed to have left New Zealand, after at least twice refusing passage to Port Jackson. A woman fitting her description is sighted in Tonga nearly 10 years later.
- Either 1807 or early this year, Ngāpuhi are defeated at the battle of Moremonui at Maunganui Bluff. Although armed with a few muskets the Ngā Puhi are ambushed by Murupaenga, leader of Ngāti Whātua, who successfully takes advantage of the time taken to reload the muskets. The fighting chief of Ngāpuhi, Pokaia, is killed as are 2 of Hongi Hika's brothers. After this Hongi becomes the war leader of Ngāpuhi.
- There is a skirmish between the Ngāti Korokoro branch of Ngāpuhi and the Te Roroa of Ngāti Whātua at Wai-mamaku. Although the battle is indecisive Hongi Hika is impressed by the muskets and is determined to obtain more.
- Thomas Kendall applies to the Church Missionary Society to be a missionary/settler in New Zealand.
- Late this year or early 1809 the Unity, Captain Daniel Cooper, is probably the first identifiable European ship to visit Otago Harbour. For a while the harbour is called 'Port Daniel' by visiting sealers. Hooper's Inlet, on the seaward side of the Otago Peninsula is named for the Unity's First Officer Charles Hooper.
- Samuel Marsden raises a band of lay settlers for the Church Missionary Society mission to New Zealand. They are to prepare the way for ordained ministers. A schoolmaster, Thomas Kendall; a joiner, William Hall; and a ropemaker, John King, are chosen to be the first to leave England.

== Births ==
- 26 July (In England): Frederic Carrington, surveyor and politician.

approximate

- (in Australia): Johnny Jones, whaler, farmer, early settler in Otago.

== See also ==
- List of years in New Zealand
- Timeline of New Zealand history
- History of New Zealand
- Military history of New Zealand
- Timeline of the New Zealand environment
- Timeline of New Zealand's links with Antarctica
