= 1814 in New Zealand =

- Decades: 1800s; 1810s; 1820s; 1830s
- See also: Other events of 1814; Timeline of New Zealand history

With the purchase of a vessel by Samuel Marsden for use by the Church Missionary Society at the beginning of the year the establishment of a mission in New Zealand is at last possible. After a preliminary scouting trip Marsden and the missionaries arrive at the end of the year and the first mission is begun at Rangihoua Bay in the Bay of Islands.

A small number of sealing vessels are operating/visiting Campbell, Macquarie and Auckland Islands. At least one visits the Bay of Islands while other also make provisioning stops in Foveaux Strait. Whaling ships and ships collecting timber from Tahiti and other islands in the Pacific also visit the Bay of Islands.

== Incumbents ==
=== Regal and viceregal ===
- Head of State – King George III. With Prince George, Prince of Wales as prince regent.
- Governor of New South Wales – Lachlan Macquarie

== Events ==
- February – Samuel Marsden buys the brig Active, for £1400, after the Church Missionary Society refuses to provide funds for a ship.
- 14 March – Thomas Kendall and William Hall leave Sydney on the Active, captain Dillon, for Hobart, on the way to explore the Bay of Islands for a suitable mission site. Also with them is Tui (Tupaea), younger brother of the Ngāpuhi chief Korokoro, who has been staying with Kendall in Sydney.
- 23 May – The Active departs Hobart.
- 10 June – The Active anchors off Rangihoua Bay.
- 11 June – 3 July – Kendall and Hall meet a number of Ngāpuhi chiefs including Kawiti, Ruatara, Tara (of Kororāreka), Pōmare I, Hauraki (aka Te Wera, of Kerikeri), and Hongi Hika.
- 25 July – The Active departs the Bay of Islands for Sydney. Along with Kendall and Hall are the Ngāpuhi chiefs Ruatara, Hongi Hika, Korokoro, Te Nganga, Punahou and Hongi's son Ripiro.
- 22 August – The Active arrives in Sydney.
- 12 November – Kendall appointed Justice of the Peace for New Zealand by Governor Macquarie.
- 19 November – The Active attempts to leave Sydney but is forced to turn back by bad weather.
- 28 November – The Active finally departs Port Jackson on its way to establish the mission at Rangihoua.
- 15 December – The Active passes North Cape.
- 20 December – At Matauri Bay, Marsden persuades Ngāti Uru and Ngāpuhi to make peace.
- 22 December – The Active returns to the Bay of Islands. On board are: Marsden; missionaries Thomas Kendall, William Hall and John King and their families; John Liddiard Nicholas (who later wrote Narrative of Voyage to New Zealand); Ruatara, Hongi Hika, Korokoro, Te Nganga, Tui and Maui. The brig's captain is now Thomas Hansen Sr, who is accompanied by his wife and son Thomas Jr (see 1815, 1816 & 1817).
- 25 December – Marsden preaches the first sermon in New Zealand.

Undated

- Having received a hand flour mill from Marsden, Ruatara is at last able to grind the wheat that he has been growing and also that which he brought back from Sydney two years earlier.

=== 1813 or 1814 ===
- 6 lascars from the Matilda desert the ship at 'Port Daniel' (Otago Harbour). One later takes the moko and is still living with Māori on Stewart Island in 1844.
- Robert Brown and 7 others of the Matilda sail from Stewart Island in a ship's boat to search the east coast of the South Island as far as Moeraki and Oamaru looking for the missing lascars. They are all killed and, presumably, eaten.

== Births ==
- 29 May (in Ireland): John Robert Godley, leading colonist.
- 6 October (in England): Octavius Hadfield, 2nd Bishop of New Zealand.

Undated

- (in England): Charles John Abraham, first Bishop of Wellington.
- (in England): George Allen, politician.
- Thomas Forsaith, politician.
- (in England): Robert Hart, politician.
- (in England): Frederick Thatcher, clergyman and architect.

== See also ==
- List of years in New Zealand
- Timeline of New Zealand history
- History of New Zealand
- Military history of New Zealand
- Timeline of the New Zealand environment
- Timeline of New Zealand's links with Antarctica
