= 1812 in New Zealand =

- Decades: 1800s; 1810s; 1820s; 1830s
- See also: History of New Zealand; List of years in New Zealand; Timeline of New Zealand history

With the outbreak of the War of 1812 between the United States and Great Britain American whalers are forced to avoid Port Jackson. However they still operate at various points around New Zealand including the Kermadec Islands as do the colonial vessels. Sealers are still operating mainly at Macquarie and Campbell Islands. Occasionally there are Māori in the crew. Timber ships are also visiting New Zealand.

== Incumbents ==
=== Regal and viceregal ===
- Head of State – King George III. With Prince George, Prince of Wales as prince regent.
- Governor of New South Wales – Lachlan Macquarie

== Events ==
- March – The whaling ship King George, Captain Lasco Jones, calls at the Bay of Islands. John Besent, an American in the crew, deserts the ship worried that locals will hear about ill-treatment of a Māori crew member by the Captain and massacre the crew as happened with the Boyd. He stays with the Ngā Puhi for 12 months and during that time hears a detailed account of what happened with the Boyd from chief Te Aara (who speaks fluent English). He later reports the ill-treatment by Captain Lasco and relates the Boyd account to the authorities in Port Jackson.
- c. April – The Frederick returns to New Zealand for provisions after 6 months whaling but Captain Bodie does not allow Ruatara and the other Maori to land as promised. He then proceeds to Norfolk Island promising to land the Māori in New Zealand on his way back to England but abandons them at Norfolk Island (without pay) and forcibly takes Te Pahi's son with him.
- 1 August – The Ann arrives at Port Jackson with Ruatara. During his subsequent stay with Reverend Marsden at Parramatta Ruatara asks that someone be sent to the Bay of Islands to teach reading and writing.
- 19 September – The Ann leaves Port Jackson and five months later returns Ruatara home.

== Births ==
- 14 April (In Portugal): George Grey, Governor and Premier of New Zealand.
- 23 April (in England): Frederick Whitaker, politician.
- 5 July (in Ireland): Frederick Edward Maning, Land court judge, writer.

Undated

- (in England): William Fox, 2nd Premier of New Zealand.
- (in England): Andrew Russell, soldier.
- John Parkin Taylor, politician.

== See also ==
- List of years in New Zealand
- Timeline of New Zealand history
- History of New Zealand
- Military history of New Zealand
- Timeline of the New Zealand environment
- Timeline of New Zealand's links with Antarctica
