= 1806 in New Zealand =

- Decades: 1800s; 1810s; 1820s
- See also: History of New Zealand; List of years in New Zealand; Timeline of New Zealand history

Sealing continues at Bass Strait and the Antipodes Islands. At the end of the year there is a new sealing rush to the Bounty and Auckland Islands. Few sealers, if any, are known to have visited the Foveaux Strait area at this time, although this may be due in part to the secrecy of the captains and owners in reporting where they operate and/or the existence of the Strait not yet being widely known. Whaling continues off the east coast of the North Island. Ships are now visiting the Bay of Islands on a reasonably regular basis. The first reports about the poor behaviour of ships crews are sent to the Church Missionary Society in London.

Between 1800 and 1806, £200,000 worth of whale oil is taken from the New Zealand area by British whaling ships operating from Sydney.

== Incumbents ==
=== Regal and viceregal ===
- Head of State – King George III.
- Governor of New South Wales – William Bligh arrives on 6 August to take over from Philip Gidley King. King does not leave until 10 February the following year.

== Events ==
- 25 February – The Lady Nelson leaves Port Jackson to return Te Pahi and his sons to the Bay of Islands. Te Pahi has been given bricks and a frame for a European house, and other goods. During the journey Te Pahi becomes ill and is nursed by ex-convict George Bruce.
- 18 March – The Argo, Captain John Bader, again visits the Bay of Islands but Te Pahi is still absent. Ruatara (and possibly the two other Māori) remain with the ship. (see 1805)
- 20 April – The Lady Nelson stops near North Cape where George Bruce jumps ship after being flogged a week earlier. He begins to make his way south to the Bay of Islands.
- 27 April – The Ferret arrives in London with Te Mahanga (Moehanga) aboard. He is the first Māori known to have visited England. In London he is rejoined by John Savage who left the ship at Cork. While in London Te Mahanga meets King George III and Queen Charlotte.
- Late April – The Lady Nelson arrives in the Bay of Islands returning Te Pahi and his sons. The ship's carpenter begins (and finishes?) erecting Te Pahi's house.
- 12 June – The Alexander arrives at Portsmouth with Teina and Maki aboard.
- 13 June – The Ferret leaves London for Port Jackson with Te Mahanga aboard.
- 17 June – The Venus, Captain Samuel Chace, is taken piratically at Port Dalrymple (Launceston) and sails for New Zealand. There are two women, Charlotte Badger and convict Catherine Hagerty, among those who take over the ship.
- 27 June – The Alexander arrives in London. Teina and Maki come under the care of Reverend Joseph Hardcastle of the London Missionary Society who tries to arrange for their return to New South Wales. However, before he can do so Teina dies and Maki is kidnapped by a crimp, his later fate unknown.
- July/August – The Venus arrives at the Bay of Islands. Two men, convicts Richard Evans and John Lancashire, the two women Badger and Hagerty, and two children, Badger's young daughter and possibly the aboriginal cabin boy William Evans, are left at Rangihoua Bay. Hegarty and Badger are the first pākehā women to stay voluntarily in New Zealand. The two men are returned to Port Jackson by visiting ships, possibly before the end of the year. The Venus with its six remaining crew then travels down the east coast of the North Island, kidnapping several Māori women along the way and selling them to rival tribes who eventually kill them. These women included the sister and niece of Te Morenga and a relative of Hongi Hika’s. Their deaths are the cause of the retaliatory raids by these two chiefs in 1818.
- 6 August – The new Governor of New South Wales, William Bligh, arrives.
- 18 August – The Ocean, Captain Abraham Bristow, discovers the Auckland Islands.
- August/September – November/December
  - – Te Aara (George) joins the Star on a sealing voyage to the Antipodes Islands and is returned again to Whangaroa.
- 8 September – The Richard and Mary, Captain Leikins leaves Port Jackson for England with (Maa-)Tara, son of Te Pahi, aboard.
- September – The Argo returns to Port Jackson. Captain Bader discharges Ruatara without pay. Ruatara meets Samuel Marsden for the first time.
- 12 October – The whaling ship Albion, Cuthbert Robertson, leaves Port Jackson. Ruatara joins the crew.
- December – The Ferret returns to Port Jackson from England with Te Mahanga.

Undated

- In the latter half of the year the Pākehā Māori George Bruce marries Te Pahi's youngest daughter, Te Atahoe, and is tattooed as a warrior. He later (his memoirs are dictated in England about 1818) becomes one of the earliest sources of insight into Māori culture at that time.

== See also ==
- History of New Zealand
- List of years in New Zealand
- Military history of New Zealand
- Timeline of New Zealand history
- Timeline of New Zealand's links with Antarctica
- Timeline of the New Zealand environment
