= 1811 in New Zealand =

- Decades: 1800s; 1810s; 1820s; 1830s
- See also: History of New Zealand; List of years in New Zealand; Timeline of New Zealand history

There are still far fewer ships visiting New Zealand than before 1810. This is due to the economic depression which started in New South Wales in 1810 and continues until 1815. The concern that the Boyd massacre might be repeated abates somewhat as a number of reports that it was provoked reach Port Jackson. As more ships resume visits to the Bay of Islands they consistently report that they are well treated.

The sealing rush to Macquarie Island continues, and Campbell Island is also occasionally visited. Most travel via Foveaux Strait. More whalers operate off the north and east coasts of New Zealand than the previous year. A few Māori are crewing on ships and one or two visit Marsden at Parramatta.

== Incumbents ==
=== Regal and viceregal ===
- Head of State – King George III. Prince George, Prince of Wales becomes prince regent on 5 January.
- Governor of New South Wales – Lachlan Macquarie

== Events ==
- 7 October – The Frederick, Captain Bodie, leaves Port Jackson to go whaling and then return to London. Captain Bodie has agreed with Samuel Marsden to return Ruatara, Te Pahi's son and 2 other Māori to New Zealandied Marsden gives Ruatara 2 saws, some other tools and some seed wheat to take with him. After provisioning at North Cape the Frederick goes whaling for 6 months. (see 1812)
- 15 December – The King George, Captain Lasco Jones, leaves Port Jackson to go whaling with 2 Māori among the crew. (see 1812)

== Births ==
- 27 January (In Germany): Ernst Dieffenbach, naturalist.
- 20 May (in England): Alfred Domett, 4th premier of New Zealand
- 7 November (in England): William Colenso, missionary.

undated

- William Crompton, politician
- Walter Lee, politician.

== See also ==
- List of years in New Zealand
- Timeline of New Zealand history
- History of New Zealand
- Military history of New Zealand
- Timeline of the New Zealand environment
- Timeline of New Zealand's links with Antarctica
