= 1805 in New Zealand =

- Decades: 1800s; 1810s; 1820s
- See also: History of New Zealand; List of years in New Zealand; Timeline of New Zealand history

Sealing continues at Bass Strait but declines at Dusky Sound which is still used for provisioning. There is a new rush to the Antipodes Islands. The existence of Foveaux Strait is not reported in Port Jackson until early the following year so sealers are still travelling via the south of Stewart Island / Rakiura which some also visit. At Stewart Island / Rakiura, and its smaller surrounding islands, the sealers often encounter Māori which they have not done at all at Dusky Sound. As many as 16 whalers are operating around the north of New Zealand, occasionally visiting the Bay of Islands and taking an increasing number of Māori on board as crew.

== Incumbents ==
=== Regal and viceregal ===
- Head of State – King George III.
- Governor of New South Wales – Philip Gidley King

== Events ==
- March – William Bligh is appointed to be the next Governor of New South Wales.
- March/April – The Alexander arrives in the Bay of Islands. Teina enthusiastically rejoins the crew. After several months whaling the Alexander returns to the Bay of Islands where Maki also joins the ship which leaves for England, via Cape Horn, before the end of the year.
- May – After complaints about some of the treatment of Pacific Islanders and New Zealanders (Māori) crewing on whaling ships, Governor King issues a 'Government and General Order', published on the front page of the Sydney Gazette which gives them some of the civil rights of British subjects.
- June – Maa-Tara arrives in Port Jackson on board the Ferret. He is introduced to Governor King.
- 5 July – Governor King invites all the Pacific Islanders living in Sydney, including Maa-Tara, to a meeting at Government House. He offers compensation far any ill-treatment, passage home or training in European trades to any that want it.
- 29 July – The Venus, Captain William Stewart, leaves Port Jackson with Maa-Tara on board. Governor King has given Maa-Tara tools and other gifts for his father Te Pahi. After collecting animals at Norfolk Island for Te Pahi she lands Maa-Tara and the animals at the Bay of Islands.
- Mid-September – Te Pahi and four of his sons board the Venus intending to thank in person both Acting Commandant Piper at Norfolk Island and Governor King for the animals they have been sent. The Venus drops them at Norfolk Island and departs.
- 20 September – The Ferret, Captain Philip Skelton, arrives in the Bay of Islands with John Savage aboard. After 1 or 2 months the Ferret departs. Captain Skelton sees a European (probably James Cavanagh, see 1804) on shore and Savage hears about him from local Māori. Te Mahanga boards the ship for its return to London. From his brief visit and conversations with Te Mahanga during the voyage Savage subsequently publishes the first book devoted entirely to New Zealand, the 100-page Some Account of New Zealand.
- October – After collecting 8 pigs from Norfolk Island for Te Pahi the Argo arrives in the Bay of Islands to find that Te Pahi has left for Norfolk Island and Port Jackson. Ruatara and 2 other Māori join the crew while it goes whaling off the coast for the next 5 months. (see 1806)
  - – Te Pahi and his sons are taken by HMS Buffalo to the Derwent (Hobart) and then to Port Jackson.
- 27 November – HMS Buffalo arrives at Port Jackson. Governor King is impressed by Te Pahi, whom he mentions to Joseph Banks, and makes plans to visit New Zealand. These plans are cancelled when King receives news that he is to be relieved as Governor by William Bligh. Te Pahi also visits Samuel Marsden at Parramatta and is sufficiently taken with the farm and various other aspects of European culture to want to bring them to New Zealand. Marsden in turn is also impressed by the Maori and passes this on to the Church Missionary Society. (see 1806)

Undated

- In approximately this year sealer and ex-convict Thomas Fink leaves a sealing ship that stops in Foveaux Strait near Bluff. He later marries into a local tribe and has many children. Fink is most likely the first European/pakeha to settle permanently in the South Island.

== Births ==
- 5 May (in England): William Gilbert Puckey, missionary and translator.
- 21 May (in England): Richard Taylor, missionary and author.
- 5 July (in England): Robert FitzRoy, 2nd Governor of New Zealand
- 24 September (in England): Algernon Tollemache, land speculator

Undated

- John Cuff, politician.
- Thomas Outhwaite, first supreme court registrar.

Approximate

- Wiremu Tamihana, Māori leader

== See also ==
- List of years in New Zealand
- Timeline of New Zealand history
- History of New Zealand
- Military history of New Zealand
- Timeline of the New Zealand environment
- Timeline of New Zealand's links with Antarctica
