= Te Atahoe =

Ngāpuhi official

- Born: c. 1791
- Died: February 27, 1810 (aged 18–19); Sydney, Australia
- Other names: Mary Bruce
- Father: Te Pahi

Te Atahoe (c. 1791 – 27 February 1810) was a daughter of the Ngāpuhi chief Te Pahi. Te Pahi was one of the senior chiefs of the north-western Bay of Islands. He was the son of Wharerau, a descendant of the ancient ancestral Ngati Awa, Nga Puhi, Ngati Rehia, and Te Hikutu and Ngati Rua. Te Atahoe lived at Te Puna in the Rangihoua Bay area of the Bay of Islands and was also known as Mary Bruce.

== Life ==
As a teenager, between 1806 and 1808, Te Atahoe was given in 'marriage' by her father to a former convict, Englishman George Bruce. Bruce had been a crew member on a voyage from Sydney to New Zealand in 1806 during which Te Pahi had fallen ill and Bruce had cared for him.

In 1807 Te Atahoe accompanied Bruce on the General Wellesley, a ship travelling to North Cape. However, the ship's captain, Captain Dalrymple, instead of returning the pair to the Bay of Islands, sailed for India via Malacca.

Arriving in Malacca in December 1808, Bruce disembarked to lay a complaint about Dalrymple's behaviour, but while he was ashore Dalrymple left for Penang, with Te Atahoe on board. Bruce met the ship at Penang and the couple returned to Malacca to wait for a ship destined for New Zealand. As no ship was found, they instead sailed for Calcutta in late 1809, seeking a passage home. They found and joined the ship Union, which was sailing to Tasmania and then Sydney; only a few days after leaving Calcutta, Te Atahoe gave birth to a daughter, Mary. Te Atahoe contracted dysentery while in Sydney however, and died on 27 February 1810.

Mary was placed with the Female Orphan School in Sydney and George Bruce returned to England, where he died in 1819 at the age of 40. Thomas Kendall and Samuel Marsden mention Mary in letters to the Church Missionary Society in 1815 and 1816 suggesting that Bruce tried to return to Sydney and his daughter Mary, but was denied entry to the colony by Governor Macquarie. In 1816 Kendall wrote "George Bruce, whom you mention in your letter would not in my opinion do any good here. The woman he cohabited is dead. The child is in the Orphan School at Sydney. It is better provided for that he could provide for it."

There is some suggestion that having Mary at the Orphan School meant that she, as a high ranking granddaughter of a senior Maori Chief, could possibly be used as collateral if hostilities broke out between the Port Jackson traders and Maori in the Bay of Islands and Hokianga regions. She was the granddaughter of Te Pahi and the niece of Ruatara, Kawiti and Hongi Hika, all Chiefs in their own right and important trading partners to the colony.

Mary was one of the first orphans at the new Female Orphan School at Parramatta, now the Whitlam Centre, Western Sydney University. She became a teacher at the school and in 1828 married a former convict, James Tucker; Samuel Marsden officiated at the ceremony, at St Johns Church, Parramatta.

Te Atahoe was buried at the Old Sydney Burial Ground which is now the site of Sydney Town Hall. When construction began on the Town Hall, she was exhumed and taken to Haslams Creek, which became Rookwood Necropolis. Her death notice was placed in the Sydney Gazette on 3 March 1810 and states that she died at 4am in the home of a Frances McKuen. Her headstone read "Sacred to the memory of Mary Bruce, a Princess of New Zealand who departed this life Feb 27 1810. Aged 18 years. Good Christians all who see this tomb, what I am come to is your doom. These words is true I do lay. The secret that is between this soul and the no mortal soul that's all in the life. Will never know the secret between me and my wife. Tho she is gone and I am here. Never till our souls before the Lord does appear. When we are there both great and small. God will discover our secrets all."

== Legacy ==
On 23 October 2014 at the front of the Whitlam Institute (the former Female Orphan School), members of the Australian Maori community, Nga Puhi elders from the Runanga an Iwi O Nga Puhi and the Director of the Whitlam Institute, Eric Sidoti, took part in a ceremony to honour and remember Te Atahoe and her daughter Mary, who arguably was the first Australian Maori.
