= 1809 in New Zealand =

- Decades: 1800s; 1810s; 1820s
- See also: History of New Zealand; List of years in New Zealand; Timeline of New Zealand history

Foveaux Strait is the centre of attention for sealing ships. Sealing gangs are dropped along the coast from southern Fiordland to Otago Harbour and on Stewart Island / Rakiura. The Bay of Islands is sometimes on the journey to or from Port Jackson. The Chatham Islands are also visited. A few whalers also operate around New Zealand; some also collect timber from Bay of Islands.

In November the Boyd massacre occurs in Whangaroa Harbour. It is precipitated by ill-treatment of a Māori crew member. There are only four survivors and the ship is later accidentally set on fire. It takes several months for all vessels operating around New Zealand to hear what has happened and through confusion and misrepresentation the wrong chief is blamed.

Māori are taken on as crew or passengers on various vessels that travel throughout the Pacific and also to England.

== Incumbents ==
The colony of New South Wales encompasses New Zealand from 1788 to 1840. Therefore, the head of state is the monarch of the United Kingdom, represented by the Governor of New South Wales. However, British sovereignty was not established over New Zealand per se until 1840, at which point the Treaty of Waitangi retroactively recognised that it had been an independent territory until then. Furthermore, the Declaration of the Independence of New Zealand signed by a number of Maori chiefs in 1835 was formally recognised by the British government at the time, indicating that British sovereignty did not yet extend to New Zealand.

=== Regal and viceregal ===
- Head of State – King George III.
- Governor of New South Wales – William Paterson is appointed acting Governor on 1 January. Governor Bligh's replacement, Lachlan Macquarie, is appointed in April, arrives on 28 December and is sworn in on the following New Year's Day.

== Events ==
- January or February – The Speke, Captain John Hingston, arrives in the Bay of Islands. Captain Hingston has chief Te Pahi flogged for not being able to produce a stolen axe.
  - – The Fox leaves a sealing gang on Solander Island. They are not picked up until 1813.
- 1 March – The City of Edinburgh arrives in the Bay of Islands, returning chief (Maa-)Tara from Port Jackson. Tara dies of bronchitis some months later (possibly July–September).
- 12 March – The Sydney Gazette refers to Foveaux Strait, the first recorded usage of the name.
- 16 July – The sealing ship Pegasus, Captain Samuel Chace, arrives at 'Pegasus Island' (now known as Codfish Island).
- July – Ruatara arrives in London on the Santa Anna. He is not allowed to see King George as he had hoped. 15 days later the captain of the Santa Anna puts him on board the convict ship Ann which is heading to Port Jackson.
- 7 August – The Pegasus discovers Port Pegasus on Stewart Island/Rakiura.
- 28 August – The convict ship Ann leaves England with Samuel Marsden and William Hall and John King and their wives as passengers. Marsden discovers Ruatara on board.
- August(-September?) – The Pegasus circumnavigates Rakiura which is charted by First Officer William Stewart and later named in his honour.
- September – The Pegasus is at the Chatham Islands. William Stewart finishes charting the islands left incomplete by their discoverer William R. Broughton.
- October(?)
  - – The Pegasus sights Pegasus Bay north of Banks Peninsula, where the presence of Māori is noted, and leaves for the south to repair the ship, apparently unaware of the existence of Lyttelton Harbour.
  - – The Fox leaves a sealing gang in Foveaux Strait under Robert Murry. Murry learns the Māori language and provides the first detailed description of Māori culture in the area.
- 8 November – Boyd massacre: The Boyd, Captain John Thompson, leaves Port Jackson for New Zealand with two Māori as crew including Te Aara ('George'). During the trip George is flogged for not working as instructed.
- 9 November – The Brothers, Captain Robert Mason sailing for Campbell & Co of Sydney, leaves what is now the coast of Dunedin having landed eight men, including William Tucker, on "The Isle of Wight" and three more on "Ragged Rock", perhaps modern Green Island and White Island respectively, to hunt for seals. The gang leader is Robert Brown. The men stay in the area and the ship does not return until the following year.
- December – Boyd massacre: The Boyd arrives in Whangaroa Harbour. George tells his father Piopio and other members of his tribe of his maltreatment. Several days later tribes from Whangaroa and Hokianga, apparently led by Te Puhi (not Te Pahi) attack the ship and kill, and eat, most of the passengers and crew. Several of the crew take refuge in the rigging but later when Te Pahi (who was not involved in the massacre) tries to save them they run off and are killed. There are five other survivors, a woman, 2 young children, a cabin boy and the second mate. The second mate is enslaved and put to work but when he proves of no use he is also killed.
- Late December – Boyd massacre: The City of Edinburgh, Captain Simeon Pattison, arrives in the Bay of Islands. Alexander Berry rescues the four survivors of the Boyd, and also the ship's papers (including some of his own). He is told that Te Pahi led the attack and leaves notes for visiting vessels to that effect. The City of Edinburgh then leaves for Peru.

Undated

Late 1808 or early this year the Unity, Captain Daniel Cooper, is probably the first identifiable European ship to visit Otago Harbour. For a while the harbour is called 'Port Daniel' by visiting sealers. Hooper's Inlet, on the seaward side of the Otago Peninsula is named for the Unity's First Officer Charles Hooper.

== Births ==
- 4 March (in England): Charles Parker, politician.
- 5 April (in England): George Augustus Selwyn, first Anglican Bishop of New Zealand.
- 11 October (in France): Philippe Viard, first Roman Catholic Bishop of Wellington.

undated

- (in Scotland): John Barr, poet.
- John Bathgate, politician.
- Alfred Brandon, politician.
- William Brown, politician.

== See also ==
- List of years in New Zealand
- Timeline of New Zealand history
- History of New Zealand
- Military history of New Zealand
- Timeline of the New Zealand environment
- Timeline of New Zealand's links with Antarctica
