= 1800 in New Zealand =

- Decades: 1800s; 1810s; 1820s
- See also: History of New Zealand; List of years in New Zealand; Timeline of New Zealand history

Events in the year 1800 in New Zealand.

== Events ==
- March: HMS Reliance, Captain Henry Waterhouse, discovers and charts the Antipodes Islands.
- 11 May: The Betsey, Captain John Myers, leaves Port Jackson for Peru. En route she visits Hauraki for three days to collect timber. On board are two pākehā women, the first to visit the North Island.

Undated

- Samuel Marsden becomes the principal, and at the time only remaining, chaplain for New South Wales.

The only recorded ship visit is a 3-day visit to Hauraki (the Waihou River between the Hauraki Plains and Coromandel Peninsula) to collect timber. It is possible that sealers visit Dusky Sound and that whalers are off the north-east coast but no specific records of any such activity remains.

== Births ==
- 18 July (in England): William Williams, first Bishop of Waiapu.
- 1 October (in England): James Reddy Clendon, settler and public official (died 1872)

approximate

- c.1800 (in England): John Guard, whaler and trader, first permanent European resident in the South Island.

== See also ==
- List of years in New Zealand
- Timeline of New Zealand history
- History of New Zealand
- Military history of New Zealand
- Timeline of the New Zealand environment
- Timeline of New Zealand's links with Antarctica
