= 1804 in New Zealand =

- Decades: 1800s; 1810s; 1820s
- See also: History of New Zealand; List of years in New Zealand; Timeline of New Zealand history

As most sealing is taking place in Bass Strait, although the rookeries there are declining, there is little interest in Dusky Sound, the rookeries of which are also declining. It is however still being used as a provisioning stop and rendezvous by sealers looking for new sealing grounds to the south and east of New Zealand. Foveaux Strait is discovered in December but its existence does not become widely known for some time. There is a marked increase in the number of whalers operating in the north of New Zealand, due in part to attacks on British boats in the South Atlantic as a result of the Napoleonic wars. There is also an increase in American ships from New England.

== Incumbents ==
=== Regal and viceregal ===
- Head of State – King George III.
- Governor of New South Wales – Philip Gidley King

== Events ==
- ?March or July – The Alexander returns Teina to the Bay of Islands along with the gifts from Governor King including probably the first pigs in the area.
- May – In an attempt to maintain a British monopoly of trade in Australian waters Governor King prohibits the construction of unauthorised boats of more than fourteen feet long in New South Wales.
- June – James Cavanagh, a prisoner on the government vessel Lady Nelson, Lieutenant James Symons, runs from the ship when it stops near the Cavalli Islands. He lives with Māori in the Bay of Islands, becoming one of the earliest recorded Pākehā Māori, but avoids any further European contact.
- December – Owen Folger Smith on board Honduras Packet, Captain Owen Bunker, discovers Foveaux Strait which he names Smith's Strait.
  - – Maa-Tara is recorded as crewing on the Ferret. He has been sent by his father Te Pahi to visit the settlement at Port Jackson.

Undated

- Samuel Marsden becomes the local agent for the London Missionary Society in the Pacific.
- The first sealing gang is left on the Antipodes Islands by the Independence, Captain Isaac Pendleton. The Independence and all its crew are lost in Fiji and the sealing gang is not rescued for over a year.

== Births ==
- 30 September (in England): Willoughby Shortland, colonial administrator

undated

- James Mackay, politician

== See also ==
- List of years in New Zealand
- Timeline of New Zealand history
- History of New Zealand
- Military history of New Zealand
- Timeline of the New Zealand environment
- Timeline of New Zealand's links with Antarctica
