= 1802 in New Zealand =

- Decades: 1800s; 1810s; 1820s
- See also: History of New Zealand; List of years in New Zealand; Timeline of New Zealand history

There are no known visits by sealers this year as they concentrate on Bass Strait. However Charles Bishop and George Bass call at Dusky Sound in the Venus where they spend fourteen days stripping iron from the hulk of Captain Brampton's old ship the Endeavour, to barter in Tahiti for pork before returning to Sydney in November. There are several British whalers operating off the north-east coast, only one of which is certainly known to have landed (at the Bay of Islands). There are an unknown number of American whalers also in the area but as they do not usually call at Port Jackson their activities, including where, if at all, they land, are largely unknown.

== Events ==
- 21 May – Governor King questions the Captains of three ships, the Britannia, Speedy and Venus^{i} about whaling off the New Zealand coast.

Undated

- The whaler Harriet is the first ship known to have visited the Bay of Islands since 1793.

== Births ==
- 11 December (in France): Jean Baptiste Pompallier, first Catholic bishop of Auckland.
- 24 December (in England): Robert Wynyard, governor of New Ulster province.

== See also ==
- History of New Zealand
- List of years in New Zealand
- Military history of New Zealand
- Timeline of New Zealand history
- Timeline of New Zealand's links with Antarctica
- Timeline of the New Zealand environment
