= 1801 in New Zealand =

- Decades: 1800s; 1810s; 1820s
- See also: History of New Zealand; List of years in New Zealand; Timeline of New Zealand history

In New Zealand, 1801's main effect was on the economy. The ships' visits to collect timber came to an end that year, as the wood they had been taking, kahikatea and pōhutukawa, was found to be unsuitable for ship building. With the end of this industry the Firth of Thames area ceases to be the main point of contact for Pākehā and Māori. At the end of the year Governor King reported half a dozen whaling ships are operating off the north coast. The first recorded sealing ship visit to Dusky Sound in four years took place as most sealers visited the recently discovered Bass Strait rookeries instead.

== Events ==
- 2 March – The El Plumier, Captain William Reid arrives at Hauraki (the Waihou River between the Hauraki Plains and Coromandel Peninsula) to collect timber. There are women and children on board. In attempting to travel up the Waihou the ship runs aground causing some damage. The crew meet Thomas Taylor, who acts as interpreter for the local Māori who help in unsuccessful attempts to refloat the ship and also provide the crew with food.
- 20 April – The Royal Admiral, Captain William Wilson, arrives at Hauraki to collect timber before taking several London Missionary Society Brothers to the mission in Tahiti. They encounter Māori who help with provisioning and inform them of a ship further up river. They send a boat several days later which soon finds the El Plumier. Captain Wilson later encounters Thomas Taylor who had been staying with local Māori for 2 years. Captain Wilson and the LMS Brothers record some details of Māori life given to them by Taylor.
- 15 June – The Royal Admiral leaves Hauraki. The Brothers from the LMS later write accounts of New Zealand and raise the possibility of sending a mission there. However the timber voyages end later in the year and nothing comes of these suggestions.
- 20 August – The El Plumier leaves Hauraki. She is later captured by the Spanish at Guam and all records of her visit to New Zealand are lost.
- 5 – 21 December – TheVenus^{ii}, Captain George Bass, visits Dusky Sound. The crew investigates seal rookeries, cut timber and retrieve iron from the beached wreck of the Endeavour (see 1795–97).

== Births ==
- 7 February (in Scotland): James Busby, British Resident of New Zealand

undated

- William Wakefield, colonist.

approximate

- William Hutt – British MP and chairman of the New Zealand Company.

== See also ==
- History of New Zealand
- List of years in New Zealand
- Military history of New Zealand
- Timeline of New Zealand history
- Timeline of New Zealand's links with Antarctica
- Timeline of the New Zealand environment
