= 1803 in New Zealand =

- Decades: 1800s; 1810s; 1820s
- See also: History of New Zealand; List of years in New Zealand; Timeline of New Zealand history

There is a lessening of the sealing rush at Bass Strait as the rookeries become thinner, and as a result sealers return to Dusky Sound and explore the surrounding coast. Little of the movements of these ships is actually recorded as a veil of secrecy still surrounds their activities while the various ships try to make the most of any discoveries before the competition arrives. They occasionally meet local Māori but little information regarding these encounters survives. There are again around half a dozen whalers off the north-east coast of New Zealand, a few of which call into the Bay of Islands. The first Māori to join a whaling ship, and possibly the first to leave New Zealand in 10 years, does so early in the year.

== Incumbents ==
=== Regal and viceregal ===
- Head of State – King George III.
- Governor of New South Wales – Philip Gidley King

== Events ==
- 30 January – George Bass asks Governor King of New South Wales for a fishing monopoly from a line bisecting New Zealand from Dusky Sound to Otago Harbour extending south to include the subantarctic islands. It is not granted but shows the sealers' area of interest at this time.
- 1 June – Alexander, Captain Robert Rhodes, arrives in Port Jackson with Teina aboard. Teina is the first Māori recorded to have left New Zealand since Tuki and Huru in 1793. Teina may have been related to Huru while the Sydney Gazette reports that Tuki spoke with the Alexander, possibly when it visited Doubtless Bay.
- 19 September – Alexander leaves Port Jackson to return Teina to New Zealand. Teina has stayed with Governor King while in Sydney and has been given gifts to take back with him, including pigs.
- December – Scorpion, William Dagg, master, lands in Dagg Sound.

Undated

- Phillip Tapsell (born Hans Felk) visits New Zealand for the first time, on a whaling ship (possibly the Alexander) which calls at the Bay of Islands. (See also 1823, 1828 and 1830).

== Births ==
- 21 July (in England): Henry Samuel Chapman, Judge, journalist, politician.
- 23 October (in England): Alfred Nesbitt Brown, missionary.

undated

- Francis Gledhill, politician.

== See also ==
- History of New Zealand
- List of years in New Zealand
- Military history of New Zealand
- Timeline of New Zealand history
- Timeline of New Zealand's links with Antarctica
- Timeline of the New Zealand environment
