= Santa Anna (1806 ship) =

History

Spain
- Name: Santa Anna
- Builder: Brazils
- Captured: 18 June 1806

United Kingdom
- Owner: 1806: Lord, Kable, & Underwood; 1810: William Dagg
- Acquired: 18 June 1806 by capture
- Fate: Wrecked 11 August 1811

General characteristics
- Tons burthen: 220 or 225 (bm)

Santa Anna was a Spanish brig that a British privateer captured in 1806. Her new owners then employed Santa Anna as a whaler. She wrecked in the Straits of Timor in 1811.

== Capture ==
On 18 June 1806, the British privateer Port au Prince's boats entered San Blas Bay (possibly San Blas, Nayarit), and captured Santa Anna. Santa Anna was a "corbetta" under the command of Captain Francisco Puertas and carrying a cargo of pitch, tar, and cedar boards to Guayaquil. The next day Captain Isaac Duck of Port au Prince sent 20 of his Spanish prisoners ashore in his longboat. Two Spaniards and two negro slaves joined Port au Prince. The slaves belonged to Santa Anna's owner; legally Duck should have sent them ashore too, but they pleaded not to go have to go ashore and Duck yielded to their pleas. Duck then put Mr. Charles Maclaren in command of Santa Anna and gave him a crew of 12 men, plus a Spaniard, to navigate her to Port Jackson.

== Subsequent career ==
Santa Anna arrived at Port Jackson on 24 October 1806. There the Vice admiralty court condemned her and Maclaren sold her for £3200. A list of ship arrivals and departures gives the cargo of the "Santa Anna prize" as "sugar, etc." The last of her cargo was sold on 8 December 1806, and it included a "bale of chillies".

Lord, Kable, & Underwood purchased her for use as a whaler. She left Port Jackson on 14 July 1807, under the command of Captain William Moody, and with a crew of 20 men. She was bound for the New Zealand seal fisheries and then London. At the Bay of Islands Moody picked up Ruatara (or Duaterra), a Maori chief who wanted to travel to London to meet King George. Santa Anna then sailed to the Bounty Islands, where she left a "gang" for what would be 10 months. The men left included Ruatara, another Maori, two Tahitians, and ten British sailors. Santa Anna then sailed to Norfolk Island and Sydney.

Santa Anna reached Sydney from Norfolk Island on 6 June 1808, and left for the Bounty Islands on 15 October. There she picked up 8000 sealskins and the 11 survivors of the shore party that she had left. She had left the shore party with short rations, and despite reports that a resupply vessel had been sent, the shore party did not get resupplied until the whaler King George arrived a few weeks before Santa Anna returned.

Santa Anna reached Deal on 13 July 1809. (Note: "Anna", Moody, master, arrived from the South Seas.) Ruatara did not get to see King George. Moody refused to pay him back wages and clothing, but offered to send him back via Ann, which the government had hired to take some 200 prisoners to New South Wales. Captain Charles Clarke, of Ann refused to take Ruatara on board without seaman's clothing, which the Reverend Samuel Marsden, who was returning to Australia on her, purchased for him. Ann left Portsmouth shortly after 25 August, with Marsden taking the opportunity of the voyage to learn Maori and to teach Ruatara more English. Ann arrived in Sydney on 17 or 27 February 1810. After more misadventures Ruatara eventually reached home in 1812 or so. There he reciprocated Marsden's kindness and friendship by facilitating the Reverend's mission to the Maori.

Santa Anna first appeared in Lloyd's Register (LR) in 1810, with William Dagg, master and owner. Her trade was London–South Seas.

In 1810, William Dagg acquired Santa Anna; between 1803 and 1806, he had been captain of the whaler Scorpion. Santa Anna was on the Protection List in 1810, and on 23 May 1810, Dagg sailed her for the South Sea Whale Fishery. Santa Anna arrived at Sydney on 5 February 1811, and left for the seal fishery on 10 April. At the time of sailing she was carrying 45 tons of sperm whale oil, but wished to complete her cargo.

== Loss ==
On the way back to England she was wrecked in the Straits of Timor. On 21 February 1812, Lloyd's List reported that Santa Anna, Dagg, master, had been lost on the coast of New Holland, but that all the crew had been saved. Henderson, based on an account by a surviving crew member, gives the date of loss as 11 August, and the location as north of New Guinea.

== Misattribution ==
Some have hypothesized that Santa Anna is the Mahogany Ship of Warrnambool. However, this is incorrect as Santa Anna was wrecked north of Australia in 1812. All the ship's crew were saved.
