= 2027 in New Zealand =

- Decades: 2000s; 2010s; 2020s
- See also: History of New Zealand; List of years in New Zealand; Timeline of New Zealand history

The following lists events that are expected to happen during 2027 in New Zealand.

== Events ==
=== Predicted or scheduled ===
- 14 January – First meeting of the 55th Parliament
- 27 January – Changes to the driving licensing system replacing the full driving test with trial periods for restricted drivers and lowering licensing fees are expected to come into effect.
- 23 March – The Tauranga City Council will hold a binding referendum on whether to retain its Te Awanui Māori ward.
- 4–25 September – 2027 British & Irish Lions Women's tour to New Zealand

== Holidays ==
Public holidays in New Zealand in 2027 are as follows:

- 1 January – New Year's Day
- 2 January – Day after New Year's Day
- 4 January – Day off for Day after New Year's observed
- 6 February – Waitangi Day
- 8 February – Waitangi Day observed
- 26 March – Good Friday
- 29 March – Easter Monday
- 25 April – Anzac Day
- 26 April – Anzac Day observed
- 7 June – King's Birthday
- 25 June – Matariki
- 25 October – Labour Day
- 25 December – Christmas Day
- 26 December – Boxing Day
- 27 December – Christmas Day observed
- 28 December – Boxing Day observed
