= Ann (1797 ship) =

History

Netherlands
- Builder: Batavia
- Laid down: 1797

United Kingdom
- Name: Ann (or Anne)
- Owner: 1801: Kennion; 1812: Hibbert; Later: Various
- Fate: Last listed c. 1865

General characteristics
- Tons burthen: 627, or 629 (bm)
- Complement: 80
- Armament: 1801:12 × 2&4-pounder + 4 × 12-pounder guns; 1809: 26 × 18&12-pounder guns; 1812: 20 guns
- Notes: Teak-built; three decks

Ann (or Anne) was built in Batavia in 1797. How she came into British hands is currently unclear. She first appeared in a register in 1802, and thereafter made a voyage for the British East India Company (EIC). In 1809 she made a voyage transporting convicts to New South Wales for the British government. On her return voyage she carried cargo for the EIC from Calcutta to London. She then became a West Indiaman, trading between London and Jamaica. Later she traded with Australia and India, and is last listed c.1865.

== EIC voyage (1801–1802) ==
Ann, built in Batavia in 1797, appeared in the Register of Shipping in 1801 with Chapman, master, Kennion, owner, and trade London—Jamaica.

Captain James Stewart sailed Ann from Calcutta on 19 November 1801. She was at Saugor on 31 January 1802, reached St Helena on 20 April, and arrived at Gravesend on 25 June.

== Convict transport and EIC voyage (1809–1811) ==
On 21 June 1809 Captain Charles Clarke acquired a letter of marque. He sailed Ann from Spithead on 25 August 1809. (Note: One of her crew was Ruatara (or Duaterra), a Maori chief who had come to London on Santa Anna in an unsuccessful attempt to meet King George III.) Ann stopped at Rio de Janeiro around 15 November and arrived at Port Jackson on 17, or 27 February 1810. (Note: One source gives her date of arrival in Port Jackson as 14 March 1809, and her date of departure from there as 21 June, but this is incorrect.)

Ann transported 200 male convicts, but unloaded two before departure. One died on the way and she landed 197 in Sydney. A detachment of the 73rd Regiment of Foot provided the guard. Among her passengers were the Reverend Samuel Marsden and the Maori chief Ruatara.

After she left Port Jackson Ann sailed for Bengal, and was at Calcutta by 21 September 1810. Homeward bound, she passed Saugor on 24 November, reached St Helena on 20 February 1811, and on 26 April was at East India Dock, in London.

Ann first appeared in Lloyd's Register in 1812 with master "Inneranty", changing to "Hamilton", and with owner "Hibbert". Her trade was given as London — Jamaica.

== Subsequent career ==
| Year | Master | Owner | Trade | Notes |
|---|---|---|---|---|
| 1815 | Hamilton | Hibberts | London — Jamaica | |
| 1820 | Hamilton | Hibberts | London — Jamaica | |
| 1825 | Nixon | Hibberts | London — Jamaica | Launch year of 1794 |
| 1830 | Foreman; Palmer | Hibberts | London — Jamaica | Launch year of 1794 |
| 1835 | S. Palmer | Hibbert and Co. | London — Jamaica | 665 tons (bm); no launch year |
| 1840 | Murray | Hibbert | London — Sydney | No launch year but notation "Prize" |
| 1845 | Pryce | Manning | London | 665 tons (bm); prize |
| 1850 | Clinch | Manning | London — Bombay | 665 tons (bm); prize |
| 1855 | J. Brown | Carter & Co. | London — India | 665 tons (bm); prize |
| 1860 | S Daendia | Galei | | 665 tons (bm); prize |
| 1864 | S Daendia | Galei | | 665 tons (bm); prize |
| 1865 | | | | Missing page |
| 1866 | | | | Not listed |
