= Rangihoua Bay =

Bay on the Purerua Peninsula in Northland, New Zealand

Coordinates: 35°10′30″S 174°05′30″E

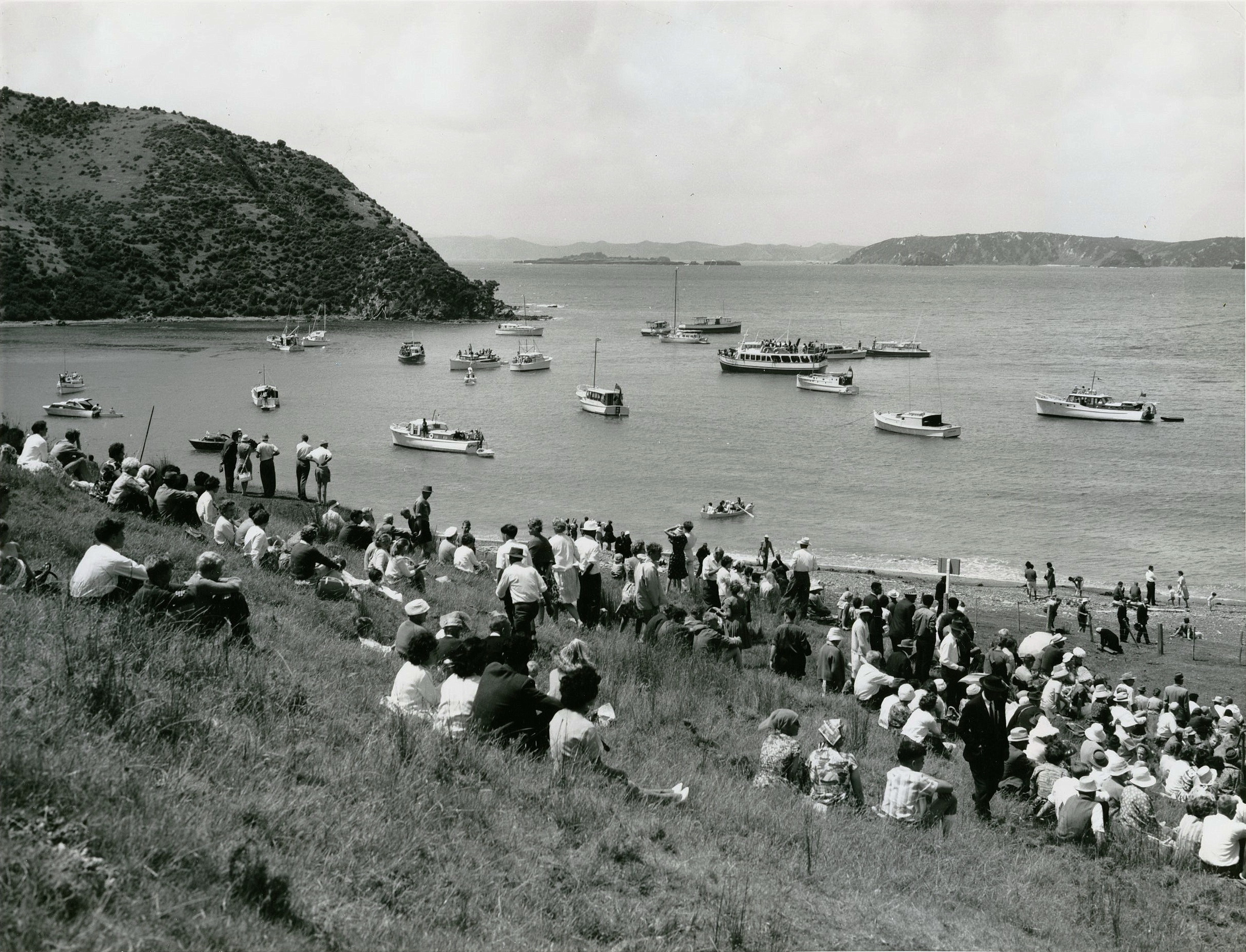
Rangihoua Bay in 1964 at the time of the 150th anniversary of the first Christian service held there, where the Rev. R E Marsden (great-great-grandson of Samuel Marsden) conducted a commemorative service.

Rangihoua Bay is a bay at the southern end of the Purerua Peninsula, on the north-west shore of the Bay of Islands in Northland, New Zealand. It lies 10 km north across the Bay of Islands from Russell and 12 km north from Paihia. It is 32 km from Kerikeri by road.

== History ==
In the early 19th century, when European ships first began visiting the area, the Ngāpuhi chief Te Pahi had a pā at Rangihoua. After his death in 1810 he was succeeded as chief by Ruatara. It was the friendship of Te Pahi and Ruatara with Samuel Marsden that led Marsden to decide that Rangihoua would be the site of the first Christian mission in New Zealand. Prior to the establishment of the mission Ruatara had been the first to grow wheat in New Zealand, at Rangihoua in 1812.

The missionaries, John King, Thomas Kendall, and William Hall, together with free settler Thomas Hansen, arrived in Rangihoua Bay on board the brig Active on 22 December 1814. The first Christian sermon on New Zealand land was preached by Marsden at Oihi Bay (a small cove in the north-east of Rangihoua Bay) on Christmas Day, 1814.

On 24 February 1815 Marsden purchased land at Rangihoua for the first New Zealand mission.

The death of Ruatara on 15 March 1815 and the loss of his protection for the mission may have contributed to a lack of growth of European settlement in the area and its subsequent displacement, in the 1820s, by the mission at Kerikeri as the senior mission in New Zealand. By the 1830s the houses of the mission at Oihi had deteriorated considerably and the mission was moved to Te Puna, further to the west in Rangihoua Bay. The mission finally closed in the 1850s.

On 21 December 2014 the Rangihoua Heritage Park was opened to commemorate the bicentennial of the establishment of the mission.

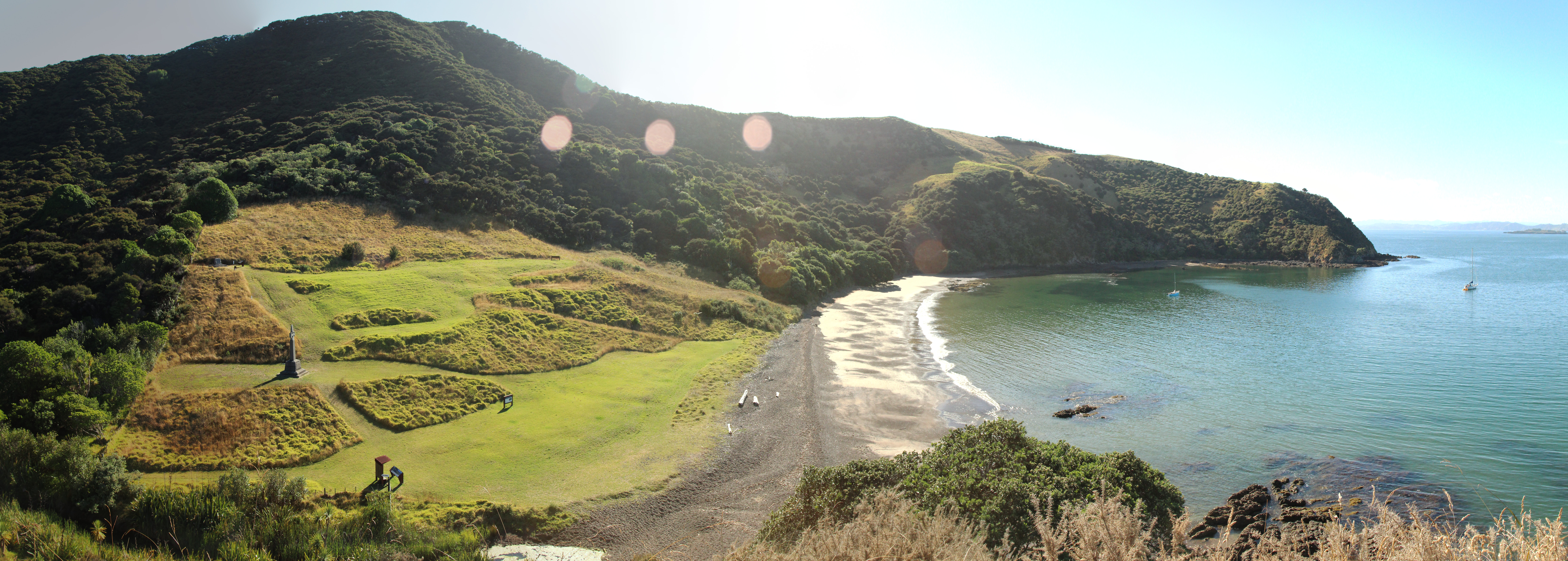
Rangihoua Bay and Oihi missionary settlement

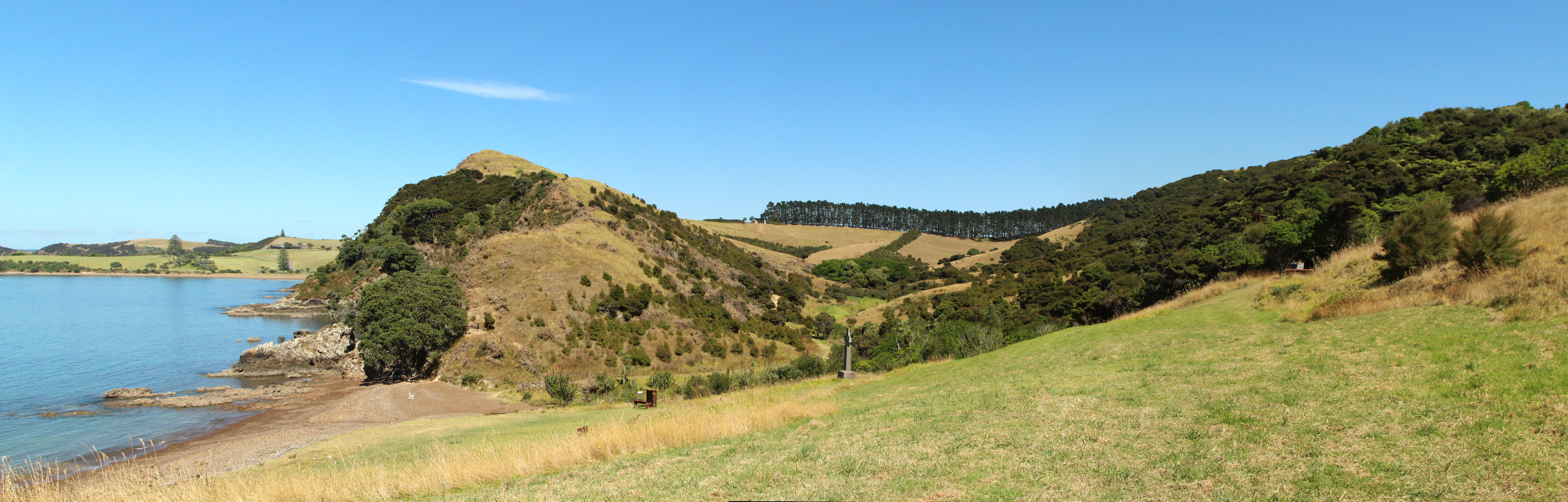
Rangihoua pa viewed from Oihi
