= Te Pahi =

New Zealand Māori tribal leader (died 1810)

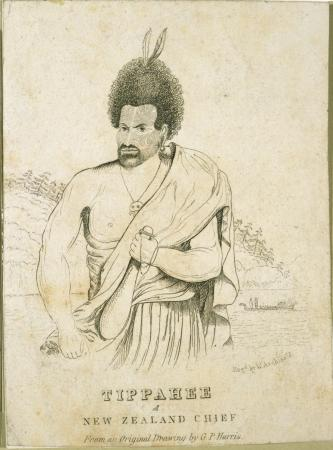
Te Pahi, Maori Chief by George Prideaux Robert Harris (who died in 1810)

Te Pahi (Tippahee in traditional orthography; died 1810) was a Māori tribal leader and traveller from New Zealand. He was from the Ngāpuhi iwi and lived in the Rangihoua Bay area of the Bay of Islands.

In 1805, Te Pahi decided to seek out Lieutenant Governor Philip Gidley King who, ten years earlier, had visited New Zealand from Norfolk Island. (Note: Lieutenant Governor King had won the respect and gratitude of the Maoris for his treatment of the two young men, Tookee and Huru, who had been kidnapped and taken to Norfolk Island to help in the manufacture of cloth from flax. At considerable personal cost King decided to return the young men in the whaler Britannia himself and he provided their chiefs with gifts of iron tools and pigs, recording his view that being on good terms with the Maoris would be of great benefit to Great Britain.) On arrival at Norfolk Island in 1805 Te Pahi found that King was no longer there. The superintendent of the island, Captain Piper, arranged for Te Pahi to continue his journey to Port Jackson where King had become Governor of New South Wales.

Te Pahi arrived in Port Jackson on 27 November 1805, and was received as an honoured guest by Captain Philip Gidley King, who presented him with a medal to recognise his visit. It was the first state gift presented to a Māori rangatira. King also presented Te Pahi with a prefabricated brick house which was built in his pā on Motu Apo Island and was the first permanent European-style house in New Zealand.

During the visit, Te Pahi also met Samuel Marsden, chaplain of New South Wales. Te Pahi attended church services and discussed religion with Marsden, who formed plans for a Church Missionary Society mission under Te Pahi's protection at Rangihoua.

Te Pahi was incorrectly blamed for the burning of the Boyd incident in 1809 and his pā on Motu Apo was stormed by crew from several whaling ships in retaliation in 1810. The whalers murdered many people, looted the island and destroyed houses, including the medal from King.

Te Pahi was wounded in the attack on his island but his death several weeks later was the result of other wounds he received in a conflict with Māori from the Whangaroa region over the Boyd affair. He was succeeded as chief of the Rangihoua Bay area by Ruatara.

== Silver medal ==
The silver medal presented to Te Pahi was commissioned by King, and probably created by Irish silversmith John Austin.

The medal was stolen during the raid by the whalers in 1810, and its whereabouts remained unknown until 204 years later, in 2014 when an auction house in Sydney offered it for sale.

Ngāpuhi representatives and Te Pahi descendants intervened to try to return the taonga back to New Zealand, and they negotiated with Te Papa and the Auckland War Memorial Trust who jointly purchased the medal. Following its purchase at the 2014 auction in Sydney, it was put on display at Te Papa in 2017.
