= Ruatara (chief) =

New Zealand chief (c. 1787–1815)

Ruatara (Note: Sometimes seen written as Duaterra in traditional orthography) (c. 1787 – 3 March 1815) was chief of the New Zealand Māori tribe Ngāpuhi. He introduced European crops to New Zealand and was host to the first Christian missionary, Samuel Marsden.

Ruatara's pā was at Rangihoua on the northern shore of the Bay of Islands.

== Early life ==
Ruatara's father was Te Aweawe of the Ngati Rahiri and Ngati Tautahi subtribes (hapū) of the nation Ngāpuhi, and his mother Tauramoko, of Ngāti Rahiri and Ngāti Hineira hapū. Marsden thought Ruatara's father was Kaparu, the younger brother of Te Pahi, and that his mother was a sister of Hongi Hika but this is likely not the case.

Ruatara's second wife was Rahu, whose sister married Waikato, a chief of the Te Hikutu hapu within the Ngāpuhi iwi. The Te Hikutu people moved to Rangihoua after Ruatara married Rahu.

== Australia ==
In 1805, he first attempted to travel abroad, and signed up as a sailor on a whaling ship, the Argo, but was cheated and stranded in Sydney the following year by its captain. Undeterred, he signed up on the sealing vessel Santa Anna in 1807. After many hardships he reached London in 1809. He stayed in London for a little over two weeks before returning to Sydney on the Ann, on which he met Samuel Marsden. In Sydney, he stayed with Marsden and studied British agricultural practices, and had a small farm at Parramatta in 1811 where he was visited by Kawiti Tiitua, the son of the chief Tara of the southern Bay of Islands.

== Facilitating early European settlement to New Zealand ==
Ruatara returned to New Zealand in 1812, and succeeded the recently deceased Te Pahi as the leading chief of Rangihoua. Rangihoua had been Te Pahi's pā until his death in 1810 at the hand of whalers who wrongly accused him of being responsible for the Boyd Massacre.

Ruatara introduced wheat to his compatriots, along with a mill to grind it, given to him by Marsden. By 1814, he had "laid the foundations of a flourishing wheat industry"; he "possessed considerable business acumen", although his plans to set up a steady export industry were cut short by his death shortly thereafter. Marsden lamented Ruatara's death at some length, noting "I attributed Duaterra's sickness to his exertions, he was a man of great bodily strength, and possessed an active and a comprehensive mind: which on his return to New Zealand he exerted to the utmost day and night to carry the plans he had formed into execution."

On 25 December 1814, Ruatara and Hongi Hika welcomed Marsden and missionaries John King, William Hall and Thomas Kendall on Ngāpuhi land, and hosted his Christian mission station, the first to be established in New Zealand. Ruatara thus "secured a monopoly over the first permanent European settlement in New Zealand, a goose that would reliably lay eggs of iron, if not gold. He had also introduced Christianity into the country as a side-effect. Ruatara's Māori neighbours were left in no doubt about who ran the new mission station or about who was the new rising star of the Bay of Islands." Through the mission, he obtained European plants, tools and pistols, "distributing European goods and knowledge" to Maori and thus increasing his mana (power, influence, prestige).

Ruatara described Marsden and Kendall as "his Pākehā", and was their protector until he died.

According to historian James Belich,

"Above all it was Ruatara's enthusiasm for things European that led them to conclude that Māori were the perfect prospects for conversion. [Missionaries] saw his premature death as near-martyrdom. [...] A fourteen-page poem on his death won a prize at Cambridge University in 1823. Behind the admirably convertible Māori of the missionary and humanitarian literature lies the ghost of Ruatara."

== Death ==
Ruatara died on 3 March 1815, following a month-long "raging fever". His uncle Hongi Hika continued to host Marsden's mission until his own death in 1828.

== Literature ==
- Nicholas, John Liddiard (1817). "Nicholas's New Zealand". Early New Zealand Books (ENZB), University of Auckland Library.
