= Timeline of New Zealand's links with Antarctica =

A map of the Ross Dependency, the part of Antarctica claimed by New Zealand.

This is a timeline of the history of New Zealand's involvement with Antarctica.

== Pre 1900s ==
1838–1840

- French and American expeditions, led by Jules Dumont d'Urville and Charles Wilkes. John Sac, a Māori travelling with Wilkes, becomes the first New Zealander to cross the Antarctic Circle.

1895

- New Zealander Alexander von Tunzelmann becomes the first person to set foot on Antarctica, at Cape Adare.

1899

- February British expedition led by Carsten Borchgrevink, including several New Zealanders, establishes first base in Antarctica, at Cape Adare. This expedition becomes the first to winter over on the continent.

== 1900s ==
1902

- Scott Island (formerly Markham Island), now part of the Ross Dependency, was discovered and landed upon by William Colbeck.

== 1910s ==
1910

- Robert Falcon Scott leaves for Antarctica from Port Chalmers. Scott's party later died on the return journey after being delayed by a blizzard.

1911–1914

- Four New Zealanders (H Hamilton, AJ Sawyer, EN Webb, and LA Webber) are members of Douglas Mawson's Australian Antarctic expedition.

== 1920s ==
1923

- Ross Dependency proclaimed on 30 July as a British Territory entrusted to New Zealand.

1928

- US Navy Rear Admiral Richard Evelyn Byrd leaves Dunedin for the first sea-air exploration expedition to the Antarctic. As part of this expedition, Byrd took part in a flight over the South Pole with pilot Bernt Balchen on 28 and 29 November 1929.

1929

- Combined UK-Australia-NZ expedition led by Douglas Mawson; New Zealand members include RA Falla and RG Simmers.

== 1930s ==
1933

- New Zealand Antarctic Society founded.

== 1940s ==
1946

- New Zealand joins the International Whaling Commission to help oversee whaling in the southern ocean.

1949

- First publication of New Zealand Antarctic Society quarterly journal, Antarctic

== 1950s ==
1955

- In August, The New Zealand Government decide to establish an Antarctic base as part of its contribution to International Geophysical Year (1957–58).
- United States Operation Deep Freeze begins to use Christchurch as a launching point for flights to Antarctica.

1956

- McMurdo Station established; construction of both Scott Base and Amundsen–Scott South Pole Station started.

1957

- 20 January: Scott Base established in Ross Dependency.
- The first New Zealand Geological Survey Antarctic Expedition sets out to conduct explorations of the Ross Dependency. The expedition names several geographic features, including the Borchgrevink Glacier.
- Hallett Station South of Cape Adare is established as a joint New Zealand-United States operation.
- Bill Cranfield, John Claydon, and a New Zealand scientist arrived at the South Pole by air aboard a US Navy airplane;

1958

- 4 January Edmund Hillary, leading an expedition using farm tractors equipped for polar travel, arrives at the Pole, the first expedition since Scott's to reach the South Pole over land; part of the Commonwealth Trans-Antarctic Expedition. Hillary was the first New Zealander to reach the South Pole overland.
- The second New Zealand Geological Survey Antarctic Expedition (NZGSAE) names further features of the Ross Dependency, including the Mountaineer Range.

1959

- 1 December Antarctic Treaty signed with other countries involved in scientific exploration in Antarctica.
- New Zealand Department of Scientific and Industrial Research (DSIR) established an Antarctic Division.

== 1960s ==
1964

- January Walter Nash becomes the first Prime Minister of New Zealand to visit Antarctica.
- Hallett Station destroyed by fire. It is not rebuilt but is used as a summer-only base until 1973.

1965

- The first flight from New Zealand to Antarctica made by a Royal New Zealand Air Force C-130 Hercules aircraft

1968

- Marie Darby becomes first New Zealand woman to visit the Antarctic

1969

- Final New Zealand Geological Survey Antarctic Expedition, which visited the Scott Glacier and named features in that area
- 12 November South Pole visited for the first time by women – four Americans, an Australian, and New Zealander Pamela Young
- Vanda Station staffed for the first time

== 1970s ==
1970

- Antarctic Amendment Act 1970 comes into force, providing protection for Antarctic flora and fauna within the Ross Dependency.

1972–1974

- First solo voyage to Antarctica, by New Zealand-born yachtsman and author David Lewis

1974

- December Joint NZ-France expedition makes first ascent, and descent into crater, of Mount Erebus.
- Antarctic Museum Centre opened at Canterbury Museum in Christchurch.

1976

- Thelma Rodgers, of New Zealand's DSIR, becomes the first woman to winter over on Antarctica.

1977

- New Zealand proclaims Exclusive Economic Zone of 200 nautical miles (370 km), which provides for the zone to also include Ross Dependency's waters.

1979

- Mount Erebus disaster: Air New Zealand Flight 901, a DC-10 on a sightseeing flight to Antarctica, crashes into Mount Erebus, killing all 257 people on board

== 1980s ==
1980

- New Zealand is signatory to the Convention on the Conservation of Antarctic Marine Living Resources, which comes into effect in 1982.

1982

- 20 January Rob Muldoon becomes the first sitting Prime Minister of New Zealand to visit Antarctica.
- June Antarctic Treaty nations meet in Wellington to discuss the exploitation of Antarctica's minerals.

1987

- Closure of Scott Base Post Office (reopened in 1994)

== 1990s ==
1995

- Closure of New Zealand's Vanda Station

1996

- Antarctica New Zealand established on 1 July to manage the Government's interest in Antarctica.

== 2000s ==
2006

- October (to January 2007): New Zealanders Kevin Biggar and Jamie Fitzgerald become the first people to walk to the South Pole without the aid of any supply dumps. Their plan to parasail back is abandoned.
- 30 December: The New Zealand Antarctic Medal (NZAM) is awarded for the first time

2007

- Prime Minister Helen Clark and Sir Edmund Hillary (aged 87) travel with an official party to Scott Base to celebrate the fiftieth anniversary of its founding.
