= Māori history =

The history of the Māori people began with the arrival of Polynesian settlers in New Zealand in a series of ocean migrations in canoes, starting from the late 13th or early 14th centuries. In isolation, the Polynesian settlers developed a distinct Māori culture over time.

Early Māori history is often divided into two periods: the Archaic period (c. 1300 – c. 1500) and the Classic period (c. 1500 – c. 1769). Archaeological sites such as Wairau Bar show evidence of early life in Polynesian settlements in New Zealand. Many crops the settlers brought from Polynesia did not grow well in the colder New Zealand climates. However, many native bird and marine species were hunted or collected for food, with some birds hunted to extinction. An increasing population, competition for resources, and changes to the new local climate led to social and cultural changes in the Classic period. A more elaborate art form developed, and a new warrior culture emerged, with fortified villages known as pā. One group of Māori settled in the Chatham Islands in around the 15th century; they created a separate, pacifist culture and became known as the Moriori.

The arrival of Europeans to New Zealand, starting in 1642 with Abel Tasman, brought enormous changes to Māori, who were introduced to Western food, technology, weapons and culture by European settlers, predominantly from Britain. In 1840, the British Crown and many Māori chiefs signed the Treaty of Waitangi, allowing New Zealand to become part of the British Empire and granting Māori the status of British subjects. Initial relations between Māori and Europeans (whom the Māori called "Pākehā") were largely amicable. However, rising tensions over disputed land sales led to conflict in the 1860s and large-scale land confiscations. Social upheaval and virgin-soil epidemics also took a devastating toll on the Māori people, causing their population to decline and their standing in New Zealand to diminish.

By the start of the 20th century, the Māori population had begun to recover, and efforts had been made to increase their social, political, cultural, and economic standing in wider New Zealand society. A protest movement gained support in the 1960s, seeking redress for historical grievances. In the 2013 census, approximately 600,000 people in New Zealand identified as Māori, making up roughly 15 percent of the national population.

== Origins from Polynesia ==
The Māori settlement of New Zealand represents an end-point of a long chain of island-hopping voyages in the South Pacific.

Evidence from genetics, archaeology, linguistics, and physical anthropology indicates that the ancestry of Polynesian people stretches back to indigenous peoples of Taiwan. Language-evolution studies and mtDNA evidence suggest that most Pacific populations originated from Taiwanese indigenous peoples around 5,200 years ago. These Austronesian ancestors moved south to the Philippines, where they settled for some time. From there, some eventually sailed southeast, skirting the northern and eastern fringes of Melanesia along the coasts of Papua New Guinea and the Bismarck Islands to the Solomon Islands, where they again settled, leaving shards of their Lapita pottery behind and picking up a small amount of Melanesian DNA. From there, some migrated down to the western Polynesian islands of Samoa and Tonga. Others island-hopped eastward, all the way from Otong Java in the Solomons to the Society Islands of Tahiti and Raʻiātea (once called Havai'i, or Hawaiki). From there, a succession of migrant waves colonised the rest of eastern Polynesia as far as Hawaiʻi in the north, the Marquesas Islands and Rapa Nui (Easter Island) in the east, and lastly New Zealand in the far south.

Analysis by Kayser et al. (2008) discovered that only 21 per cent of the Māori-Polynesian autosomal gene pool is of Melanesian origin, with the rest (79 per cent) being of East Asian origin. A study by Friedlaender et al. (2008) confirmed that Polynesians are closer genetically to Micronesians, Taiwanese indigenous peoples, and East Asians, than to Melanesians. The study concluded that Polynesians moved through Melanesia relatively rapidly, allowing only limited admixture between Austronesians and Melanesians. The Polynesian population experienced a founder effect and genetic drift. Evidence of an ancestral phase in the southern Philippines comes from the discovery that Polynesians share about 40 percent of their DNA with Filipinos from this area.

== Settlement of New Zealand ==
Māori oral history describes the arrival of their ancestors from Hawaiki in large ocean-going waka (canoes). Hawaiki is the spiritual homeland of many eastern Polynesian societies. It was considered mythical, but researchers think it is a real place – the traditionally important island of Raʻiātea in the Leeward Society Islands (in French Polynesia), which, in the local dialect, was called Havai'i. Migration accounts vary between iwi, whose members may identify with several of the waka in their genealogies (whakapapa). The settlers brought with them several species that thrived: the kūmara, taro, yams, gourd, tī, aute (paper mulberry), Polynesian rats (kiore) – and Polynesian dogs. It is likely that other species were brought, but did not survive in the cooler climate.

Radiocarbon dating of rat bones and rat-gnawed seeds and woody seed cases in 2008 indicated that rats, and therefore humans, arrived circa 1280. A 2022 study using radiocarbon technology from over 500 archaeological sites found that settlement probably occurred in the North Island between 1250 and 1275, and in the South Island between 1280 and 1295. Confirmed archaeological evidence lags this though, as no human remains, artefacts or structures are confidently dated to earlier than the Kaharoa Tephra, a layer of volcanic debris deposited by the Mount Tarawera eruption around 1314 AD.

A 2017 consideration of archaeological and genetic evidence hypothesised that, regardless of whether or not some settlers arrived earlier, the main settlement period was in the first half of the 14th century, possibly involving a coordinated mass migration. Mitochondrial-DNA (mtDNA) research published in 1998 provided an estimate that the number of women in the founding population was between 50 and 100. A paper in 2005 estimated there must have been at least 190 females, and the 2017 paper postulates that there was a founding population of 500 people, and likely more than that. The scenario of settlement in the first half of the 14th century is consistent with the much debated third line of evidence – traditional genealogies that point to 1350 as a probable arrival date for many of the migratory canoes (waka) from which Māori trace their descent.

== Archaic period (c. 1280 – c. 1500) ==
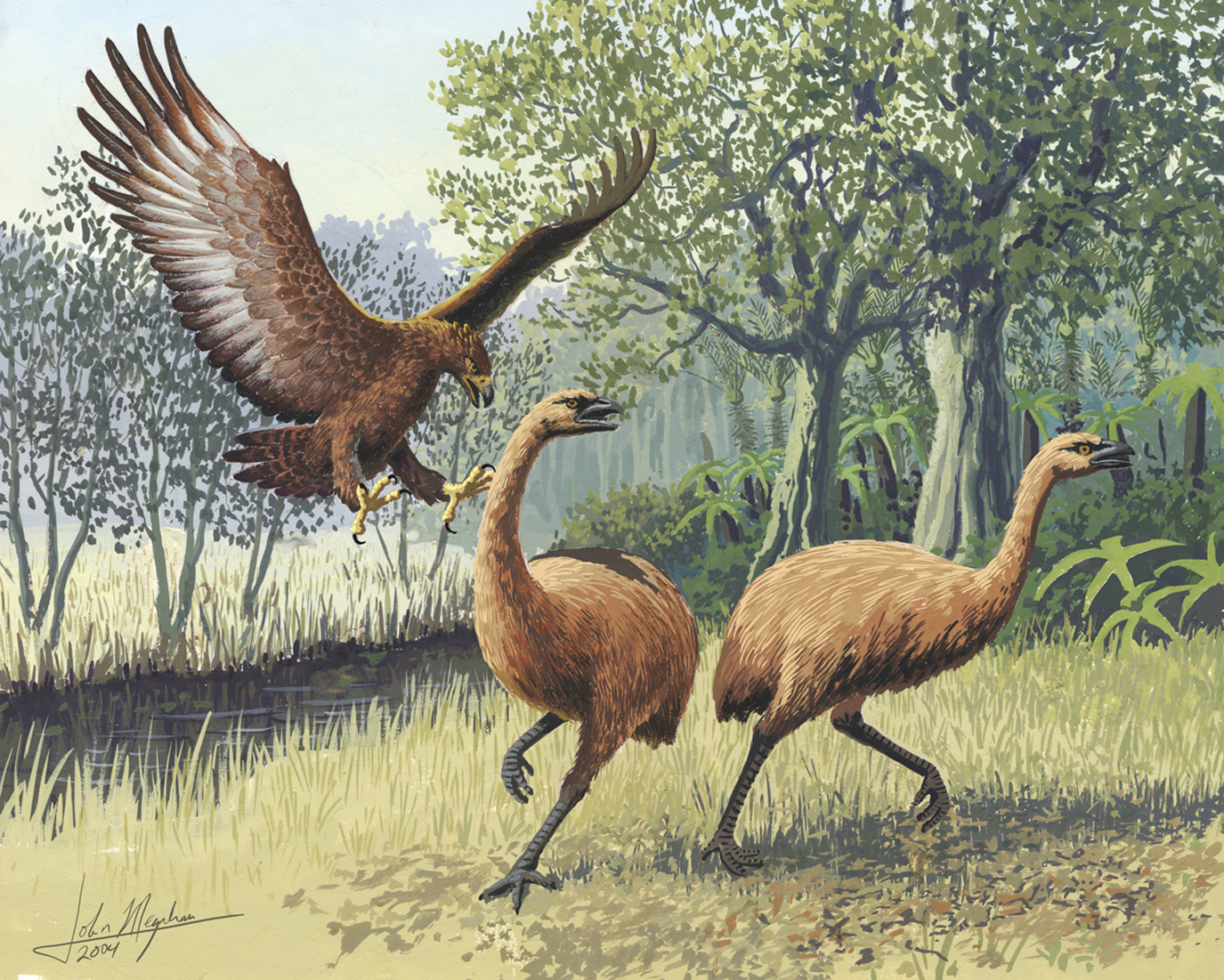
An artist's rendition of a Haast's eagle attacking moa. Both species became extinct in the Archaic period.

The earliest period of Māori settlement has been called the "Colonisation phase", "East Polynesian" phase, the "Archaic" period, and the "Moahunter" period. The eastern Polynesian ancestors of the Māori arrived in a forested land with abundant birdlife, including several now extinct moa species weighing between 20 kilograms (44 lb) and 250 kg (550 lb) each. Other species, also now extinct, included the New Zealand swan, the New Zealand goose and the giant Haast's eagle, which preyed upon the moa. Marine mammals – seals in particular – thronged the coasts, with evidence of coastal colonies much further north than those that remain today. Huge numbers of moa bones – estimated to be from between 29,000 and 90,000 birds – have been found at the mouth of the Waitaki River, between Timaru and Oamaru on the east coast of the South Island. Further south, at the mouth of the Waihemo / Shag River, evidence suggests that at least 6,000 moa were slaughtered by humans over a relatively short period of time.

Archaeology has shown that the Otago region was the node of Māori cultural development during this time, and the majority of archaic settlements were on or within 10 km (6 mi) of the coast. It was common for people to establish small temporary camps far inland for seasonal hunting. Settlements ranged in size from 40 people (e.g., Palliser Bay in Wellington) to between 300 and 400 people, with forty buildings (such as at Shag River).

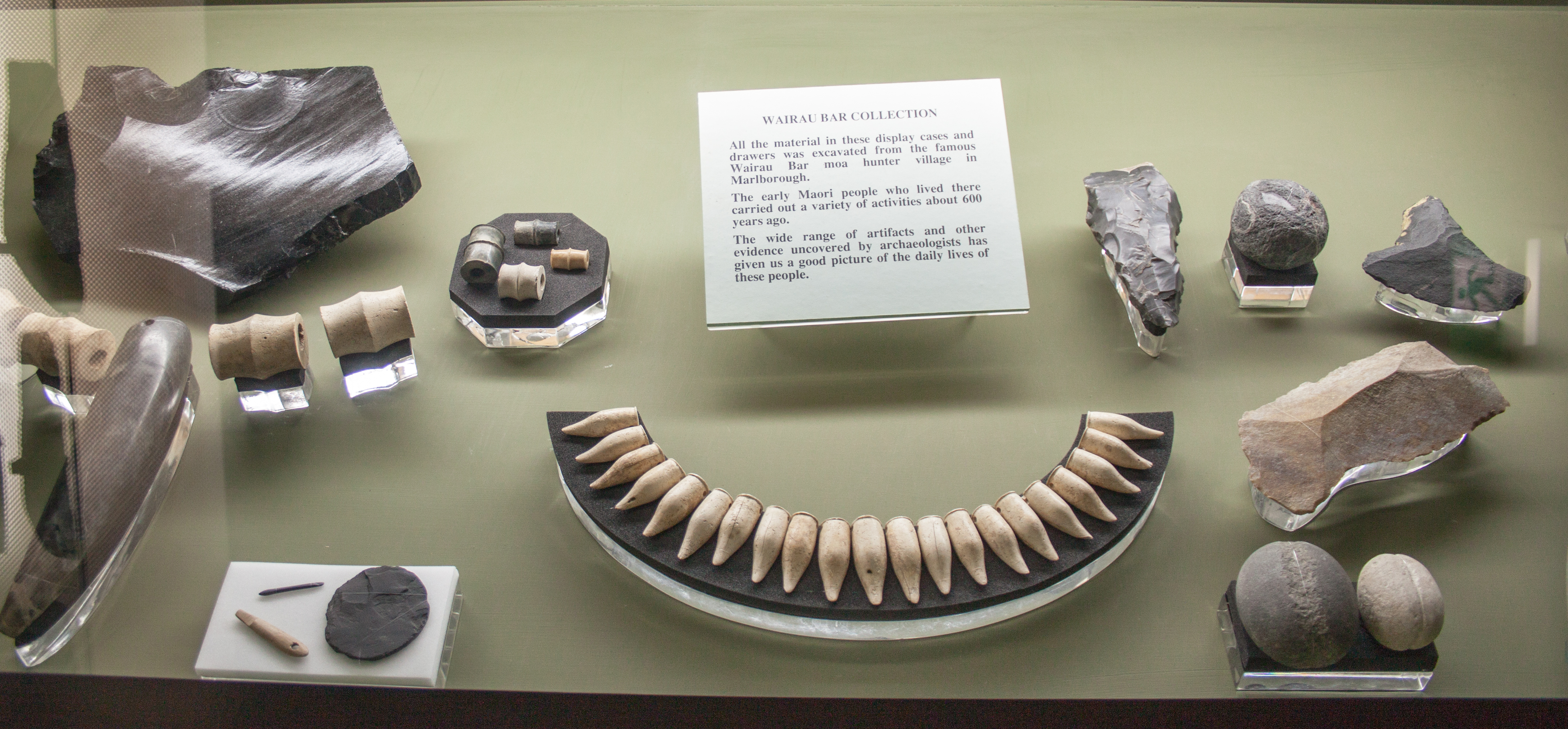
Early Archaic period objects from the Wairau Bar archaeological site, on display at the Canterbury Museum in Christchurch

The best-known and most extensively studied Archaic site is at Wairau Bar in the South Island. The site is similar to eastern Polynesian nucleated villages and is the only New Zealand archaeological site containing the bones of people who were born elsewhere. Radiocarbon dating of charcoal, human bone, moa bone, estuarine shells and moa eggshell has produced a wide range of date estimates, from the early 13th to the early 15th centuries, many of which might be contaminated by "inbuilt age" from older carbon which was eaten or absorbed by the sampled organisms. Due to tectonic forces, including several earthquakes and tsunamis since human arrival, some of the Wairau Bar site is now underwater. Work on the Wairau Bar skeletons in 2010 showed that life expectancy was very short, the oldest skeleton being 39 and most people dying in their 20s. Most of the adults showed signs of dietary or infection stress. Anaemia and arthritis were common. Infections such as tuberculosis may have been present, as several skeletons had symptoms. On average, the adults were taller than other South Pacific people, at 170 centimetres (5 ft 7 in) for males and 160 cm (5 ft 3 in) for females.

The Archaic period is remarkable for the lack of weapons and fortifications so typical of the later "Classic" Māori, and for its distinctive "reel necklaces". From this period onward, some 32 species of birds became extinct, either through over-predation by humans and the kiore and kurī (Polynesian Dog) they introduced; repeated burning of the vegetation that changed their habitat; or climate cooling, which appears to have occurred from about 1400–1450. For a short period – less than 200 years – the early Māori diet included an abundance of large birds and fur seals that had never been hunted before. These animals rapidly declined: many, such as the various moa species, the New Zealand swan and the kōhatu shag, becoming extinct, while others, such as kākāpō and seals, were reduced in range and number.

Work by Helen Leach shows that Māori were using about 36 different food plants, although many required detoxification and long periods (12–24 hours) of cooking. D. Sutton's research on early Māori fertility found that first pregnancy occurred at about 20 years and the mean number of births was low, compared with other neolithic societies. The low number of births may have been due to the very low average life expectancy of 31–32 years. Analysis of skeletons at Wairau Bar showed signs of a hard life, with many having had broken bones that had healed. This suggests that the people ate a balanced diet and enjoyed a supportive community that had the resources to support severely injured family members.

A group of Māori migrated east to Rēkohu, now known as the Chatham Islands, probably in the 15th century, possibly in the middle of the century. There they adapted to the local climate and the availability of resources and developed into a people known as the Moriori, related to but distinct from the Māori of mainland New Zealand. A notable feature of Moriori culture was an emphasis on pacifism. When a party of invading North Taranaki Māori arrived in 1835, few of the estimated Moriori population of 2,000 survived; they were killed outright and many were enslaved.

== Classic period (c. 1500 – 1768) ==
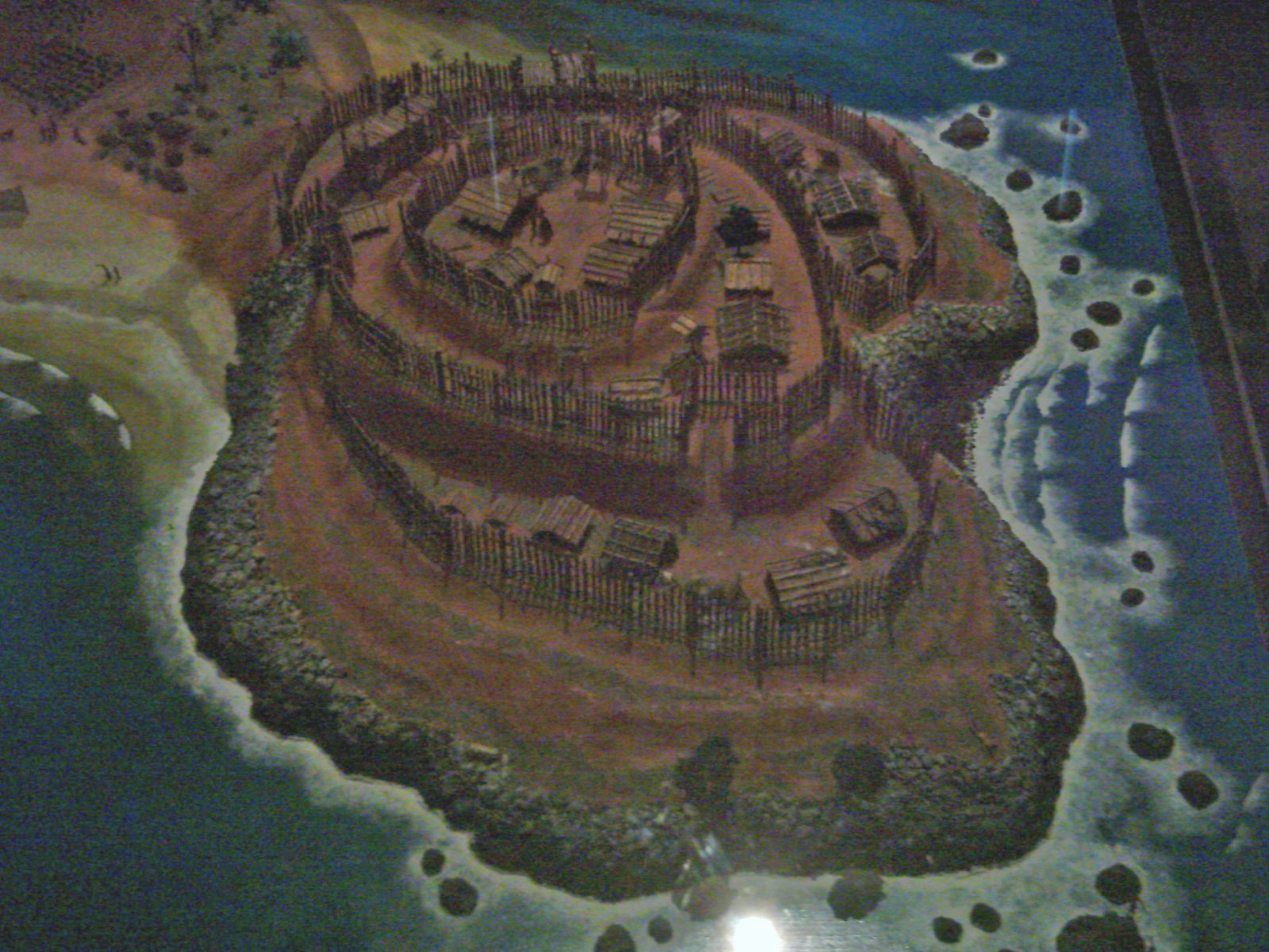
Model of a pā (hillfort) built on a headland. Pā proliferated as competition and warfare increased among a growing population.

The cooling of the climate, confirmed by a detailed tree-ring study near Hokitika, shows a significant, sudden and long-lasting cooler period from about 1500. This coincided with a series of massive earthquakes in the South Island Alpine fault, a major earthquake in about 1460 in the Wellington area, tsunamis that destroyed many coastal settlements, and the extinction of the moa and other food species. These were likely factors that led to sweeping changes in the culture, which developed into the "Classic" Māori culture that was in place at the time of European contact.

This period is characterised by finely made pounamu (greenstone) weapons and ornaments, elaborately carved canoes – a tradition that was later extended to and continued in elaborately carved meeting houses called wharenui – and a fierce warrior culture. They developed hillforts known as pā, practised cannibalism, and built some of the largest war canoes (waka taua) ever made.

== Early European contact (1769–1840) ==
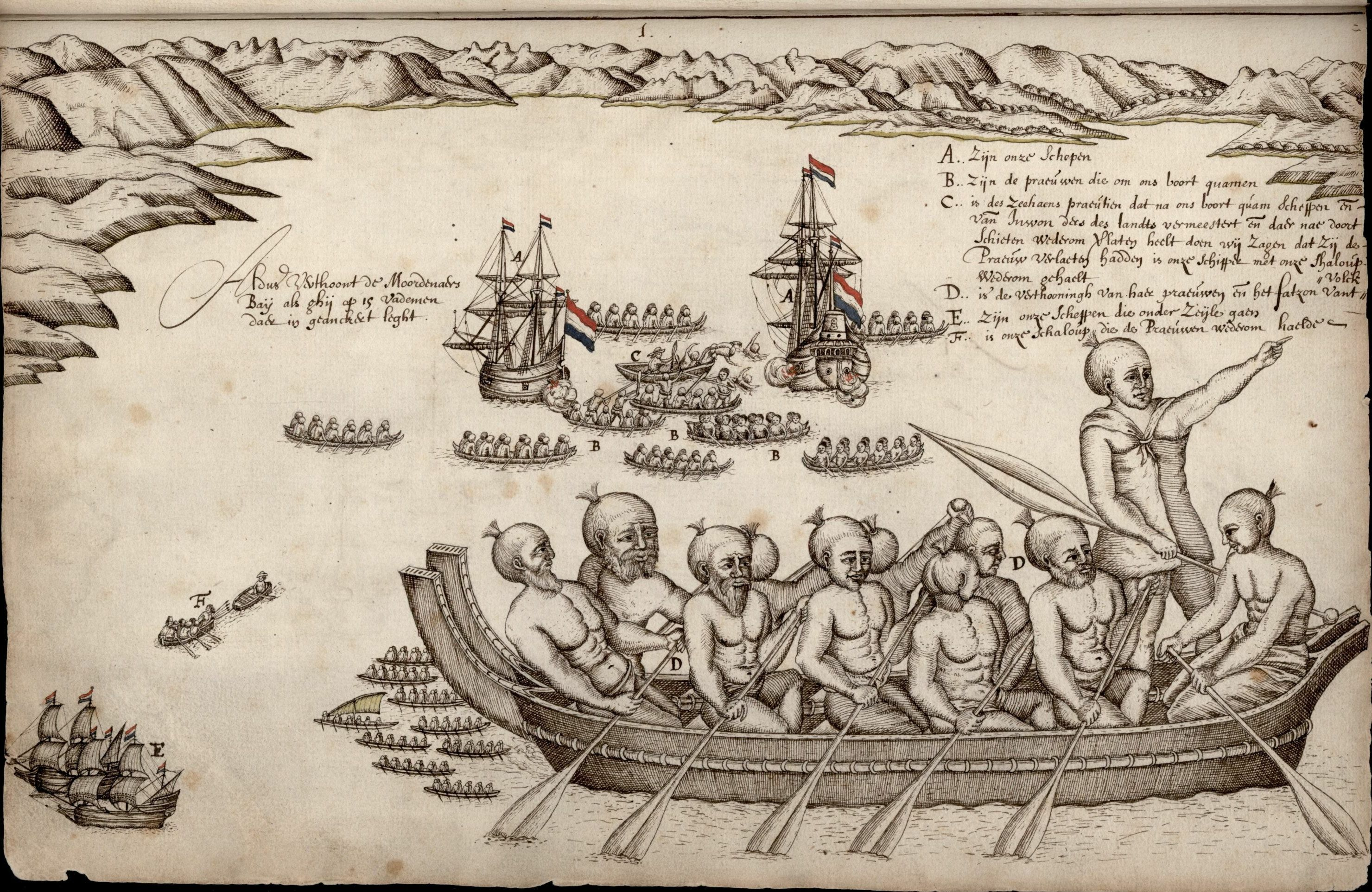
The first European impression of Māori, at Murderers' Bay in Abel Tasman's travel journal (1642)

The New Zealand historian, Michael King, describes the Māori as "the last major human community on earth untouched and unaffected by the wider world". Besides a brief offshore skirmish with Abel Tasman in 1642, the first encounter with the outside world took place with Captain Cook's party on his first voyage in 1769, followed by later contact in 1773 and 1777 during the second and third voyages. Cook spent time mapping the islands in 1769 and meeting Māori, particularly in the Marlborough Sounds in 1777. Cook and his crew recorded their impressions of Māori at the time. This early contact proved problematic and sometimes fatal, with some Europeans being cannibalised.

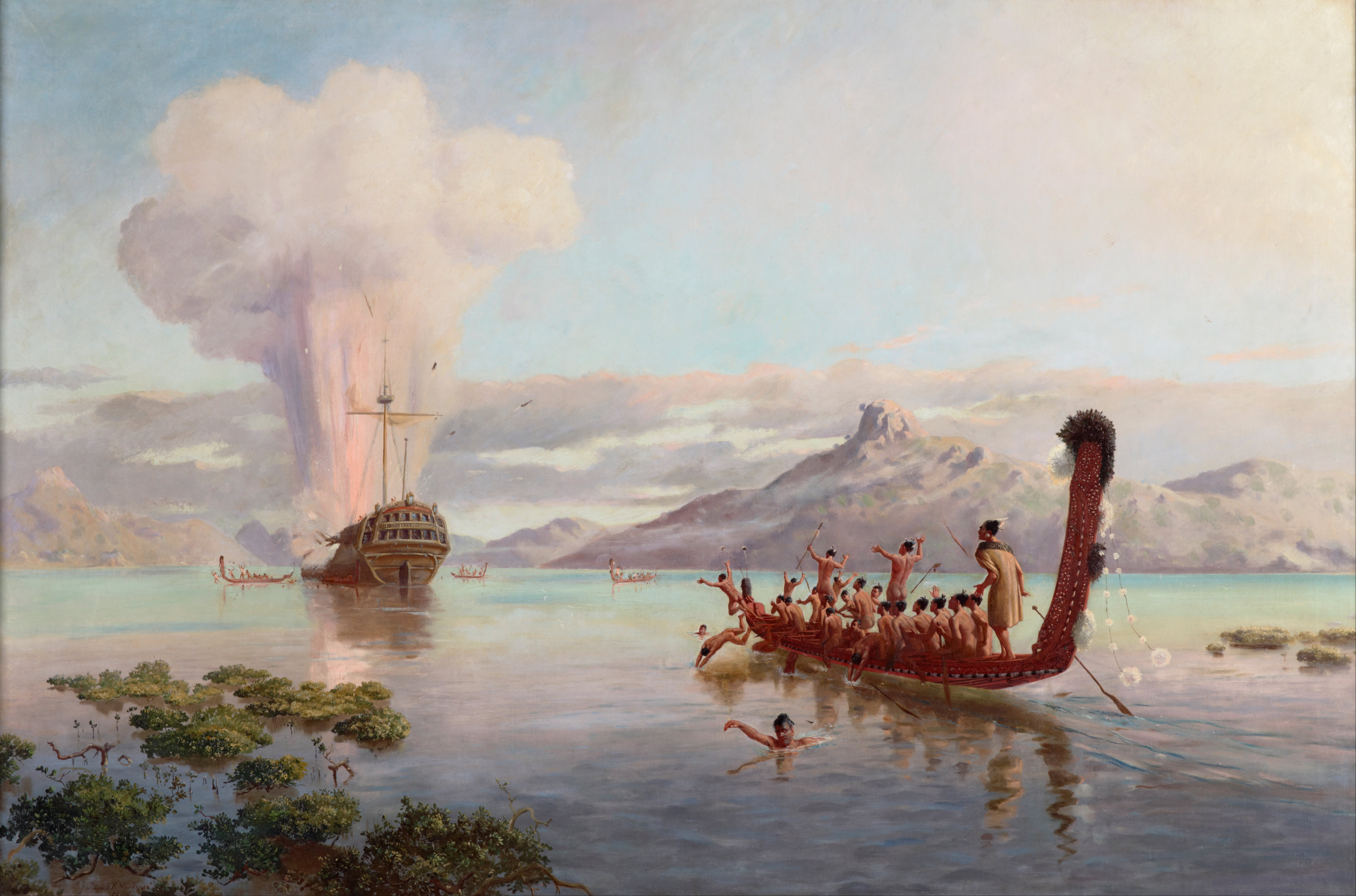
The Blowing Up of the Boyd by Louis John Steele, 1889

From the 1780s, Māori encountered European and American sealers and whalers. Some Māori crewed on the foreign ships, with many crewing on whaling and sealing ships that operated in New Zealand waters. Some of the South Island crews were almost totally Māori. Between 1800 and 1820, there were 65 sealing voyages and 106 whaling voyages to New Zealand, mainly from Britain and Australia. A trickle of escaped convicts from Australia and deserters from visiting ships, as well as early Christian missionaries, also exposed the indigenous population to outside influences. During the Boyd Massacre in 1809, Māori took hostage and killed 66 members of the crew and passengers of the sailing ship Boyd in apparent revenge for the captain whipping the son of a Māori chief. Given accounts of cannibalism in this attack, shipping companies and missionaries kept their distance, significantly reducing their contact with the Māori for several years.

The runaways were of various standing within Māori society, ranging from slaves to high-ranking advisors. Some runaways remained little more than prisoners, while others abandoned European culture and identified as Māori. These Europeans "gone native" became known as Pākehā Māori. Many Māori valued them as a means to acquire European knowledge and technology, particularly firearms. When Whiria (Pōmare II) led a war-party against Tītore in 1838, he had 131 Europeans among his warriors. Frederick Edward Maning, an early settler, wrote two lively accounts of life in these times, which have become classics of New Zealand literature: Old New Zealand and History of the War in the North of New Zealand against the Chief Heke. European settlement of New Zealand increased steadily. By 1839, estimates placed the number of Europeans living among the Māori as high as 2,000, two-thirds of whom lived in the North Island, especially in the Northland Peninsula.

Between 1805 and 1840, the acquisition of muskets by tribes in close contact with European visitors drove a desperate need to acquire muskets to avoid extermination by, and allow aggression against, their neighbours; the recent introduction of the potato allowed more distant campaigns and more time for campaigning among Māori tribes. This led to a period of particularly bloody intertribal warfare known as the Musket Wars, in which many groups were decimated and others driven from their traditional territory. The absolute requirement for trade goods – mostly New Zealand flax, though mokomokai (tattooed heads) were also saleable – led many Māori to move to unhealthy swamplands where flax could be grown. It has been estimated that during this period the Māori population dropped from about 100,000 (in 1800) to between 50,000 and 80,000 by the wars' end in 1843. The picture is confused by uncertainty over how or if Pākehā Māori were counted, and by the near-extermination of many of the less powerful iwi and hapū (subtribes) during the wars. The pacifist Moriori in the Chatham Islands similarly suffered massacre and subjugation at the hands of some Ngāti Mutunga and Ngāti Tama who had fled from the Taranaki region.

At the same time, the Māori suffered high mortality rates from Eurasian infectious diseases, such as influenza, smallpox and measles, which killed an unknown number of Māori: estimates vary between 10 and 50 per cent. The spread of epidemics resulted largely from the Māori lacking acquired immunity to the new diseases. The 1850s were a decade of relative stability and economic growth for Māori. A huge influx of European settlers in the 1870s increased contact between the indigenous people and the newcomers.

Te Rangi Hīroa documents an epidemic caused by a respiratory disease that Māori called rewharewha. It "decimated" populations in the early 19th century and "spread with extraordinary virulence throughout the North Island and even to the South... Measles, typhoid, scarlet fever, whooping cough and almost everything, except plague and sleeping sickness, have taken their toll of Maori dead".

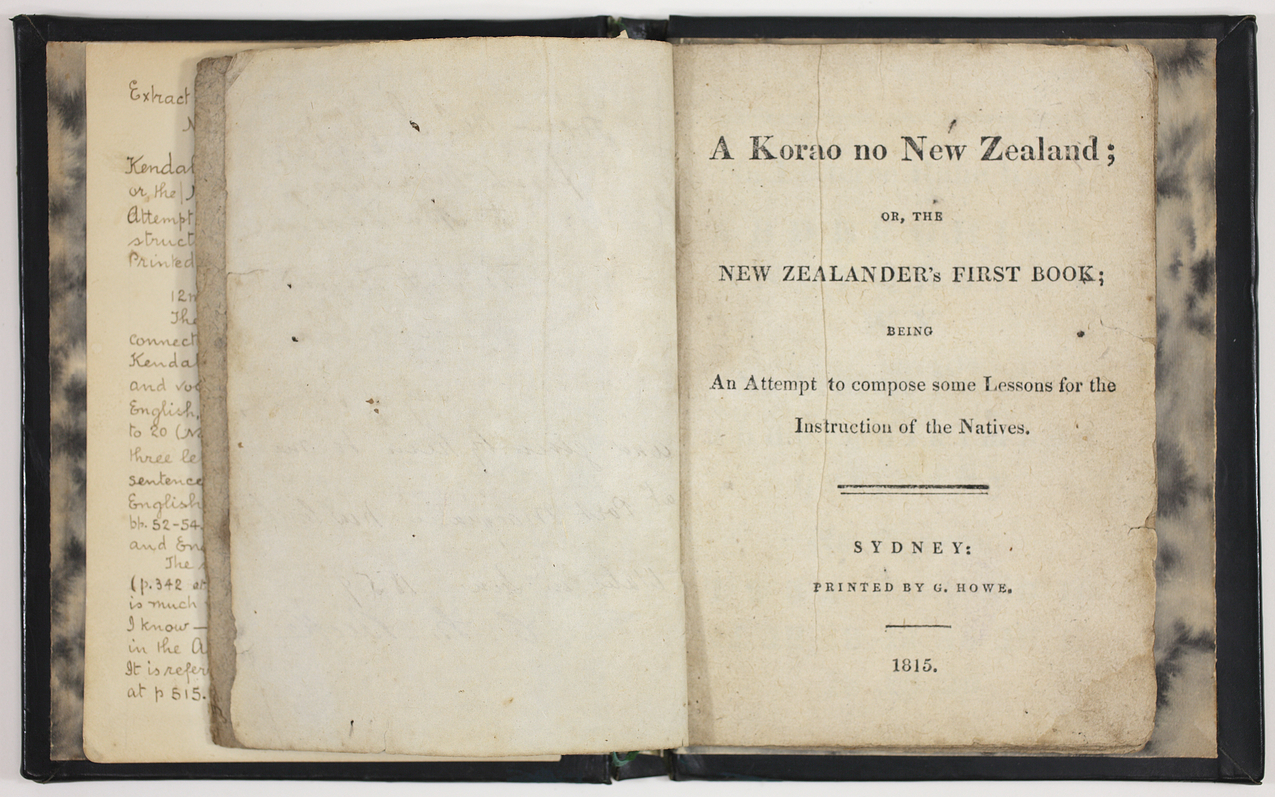
A korao no New Zealand; or, the New Zealander's first book was written by missionary Thomas Kendall in 1815, and is the first book written in the Māori language.

Contact with Europeans led to a sharing of concepts. The Māori language was first written down by Thomas Kendall in 1815, in A korao no New Zealand. This was followed five years later by A Grammar and Vocabulary of the New Zealand Language, compiled by Professor Samuel Lee and aided by Kendall, and the chiefs Hongi Hika and Waikato, on a visit to England in 1820. Māori quickly adopted writing as a means of sharing ideas, and many of their oral stories and poems were converted to the written form. Between February 1835 and January 1840, William Colenso printed 74,000 Māori-language booklets from his press at Paihia. In 1843, the government distributed free gazettes to Māori called Ko Te Karere O Nui Tireni. These contained information about law and crimes, with explanations and remarks about European customs, and were "designed to pass on official information to Māori and to encourage the idea that Pākehā and Māori were contracted together under the Treaty of Waitangi".

== Treaty of Waitangi with the British Crown (1840) ==
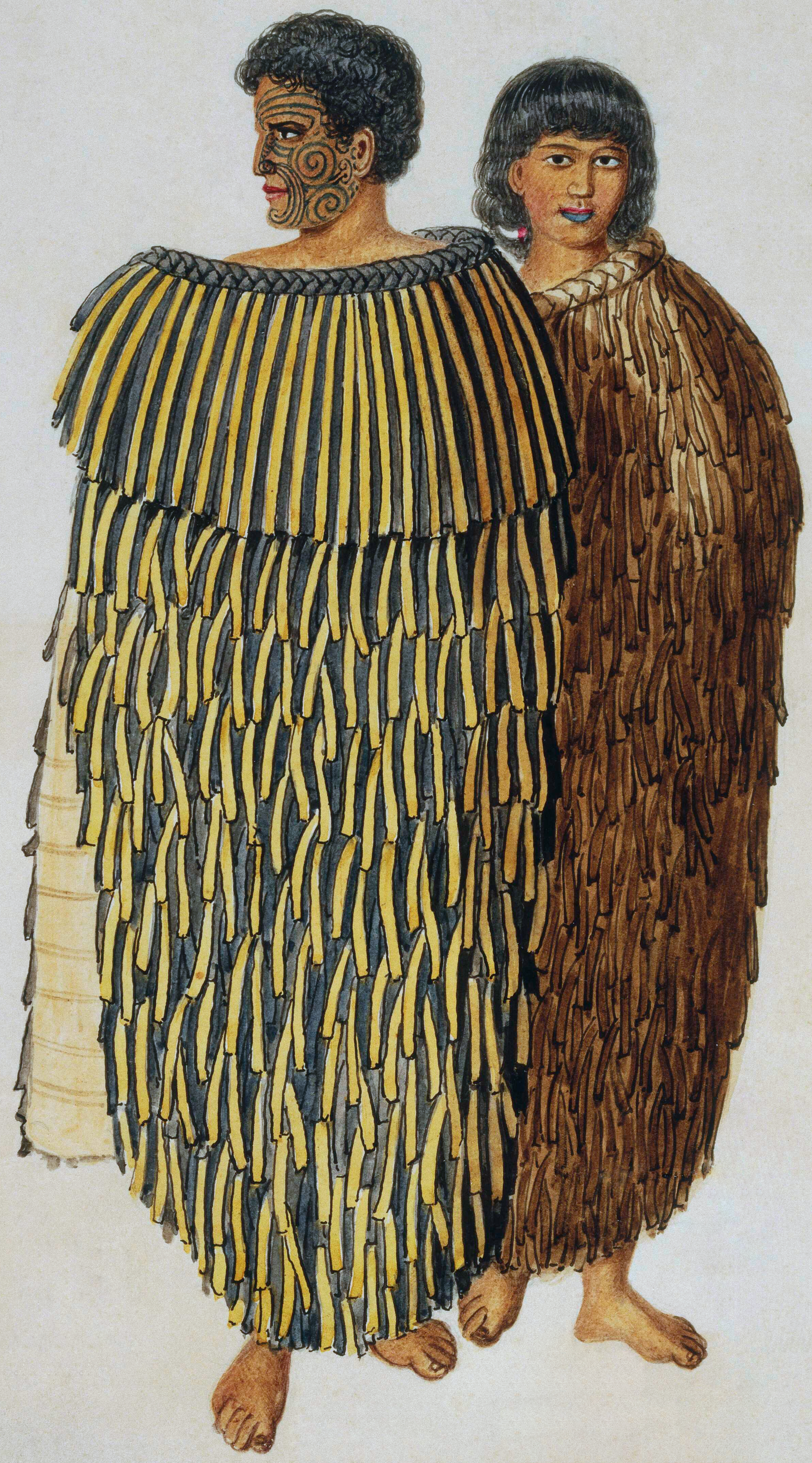
One of the signatories of the treaty, Hōne Heke of Ngāpuhi iwi, with his wife Hariata

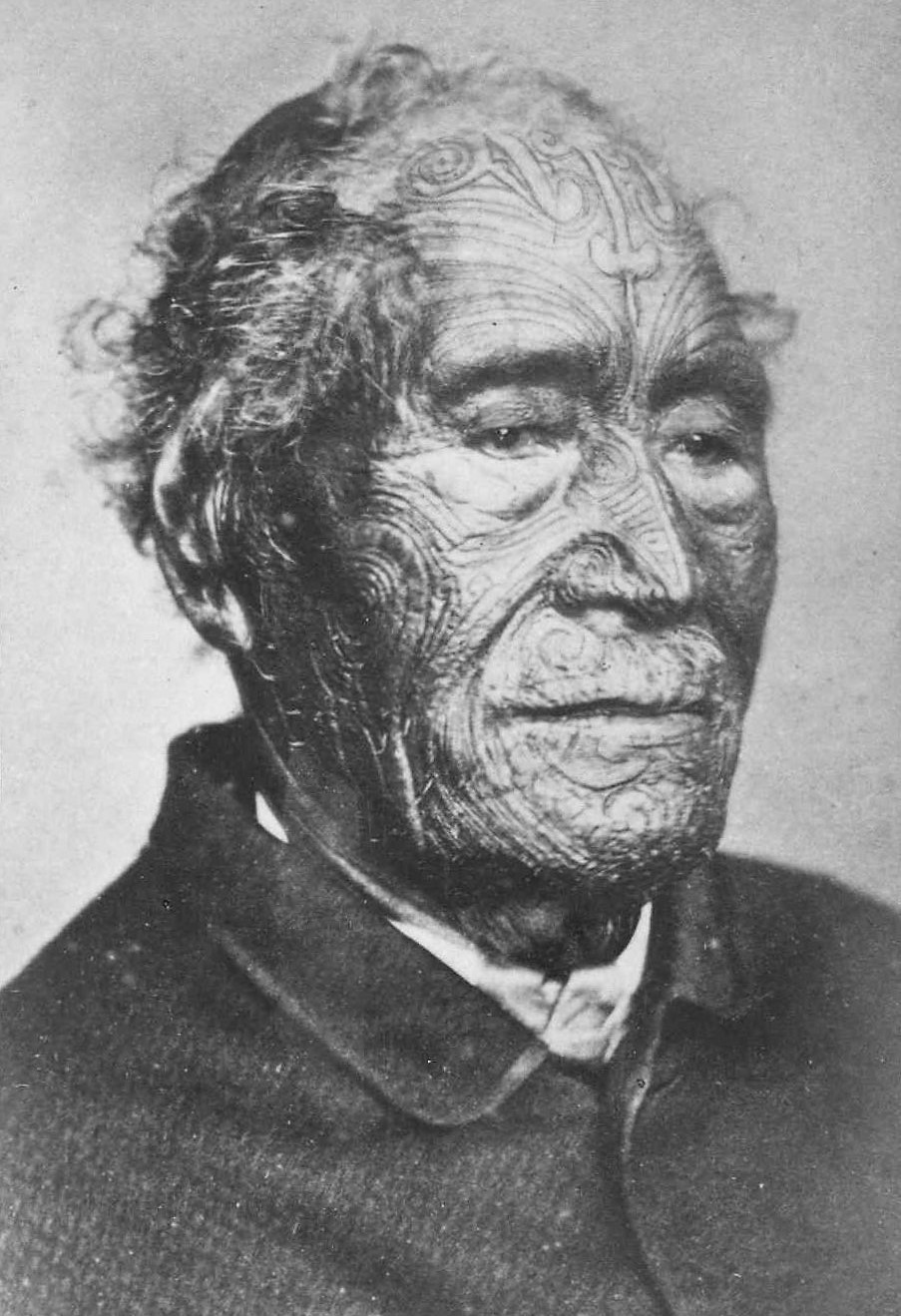
Tāmati Wāka Nene of Ngāpuhi was a signatory of the treaty, and was influential in convincing others to sign.

Before 1840, New Zealand was not formally part of the empire and was therefore beyond the reaches of British law. In 1839, with ongoing stories of increasing lawlessness and uncontrolled land speculation by British subjects reaching London, the government decided to colonise. On 6 May 1839, it expanded the New South Wales colony to include New Zealand and it dispatched the Royal Navy captain, William Hobson, with instructions to establish sovereignty over all or part of New Zealand after negotiation with Māori, and to set up a colony. On 6 February 1840, Hobson signed the Treaty of Waitangi with many North Island chiefs at Waitangi. Most other chiefs from around New Zealand signed the treaty during 1840: some chiefs refused to sign. In May 1840, Hobson established British sovereignty, in two declarations. First, over the North Island based on cession and second, over the South Island, based on its being terra nullius. Hobson then became the colony's first governor.

The Treaty gave Māori the rights of British subjects and guaranteed Māori property rights and tribal autonomy, in return for accepting British sovereignty. Considerable dispute continues over aspects of the Treaty of Waitangi. The original treaty was written mainly by James Busby and translated into Māori by Henry Williams, who was moderately proficient in Māori, and his son William, who was more skilled. At Waitangi, the chiefs signed the Māori translation.

== Land disputes and conflict ==
Despite conflicting interpretations of the provisions of the Treaty of Waitangi, relations between Māori and Europeans during the early colonial period were largely peaceful. Many Māori groups set up substantial businesses, supplying food and other products for domestic and overseas markets. Some of the early European settlers learned the Māori language and recorded Māori mythology, including George Grey, Governor of New Zealand from 1845 to 1855 and 1861–1868.

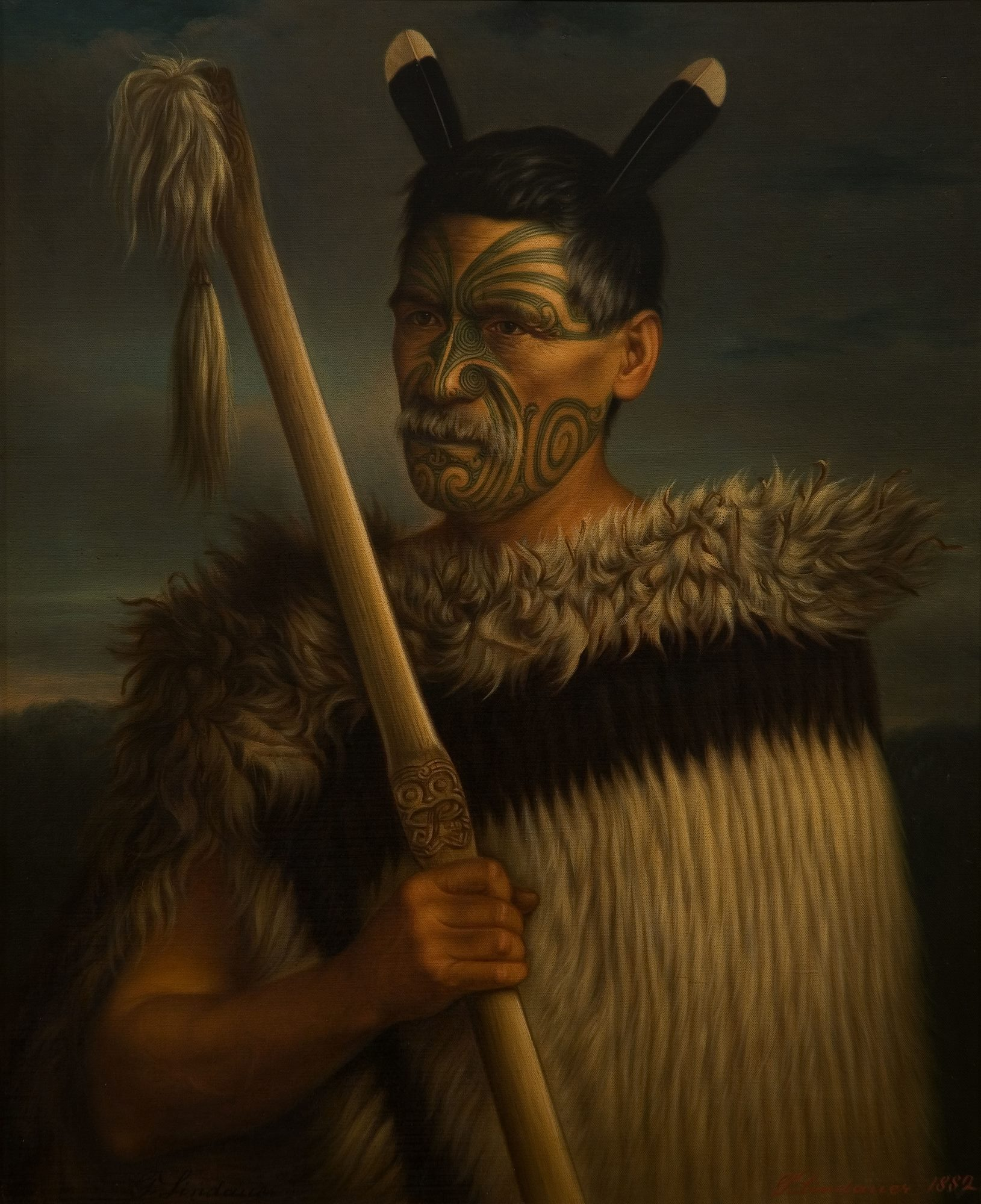
A portrait of Māori man, by Gottfried Lindauer, 1882

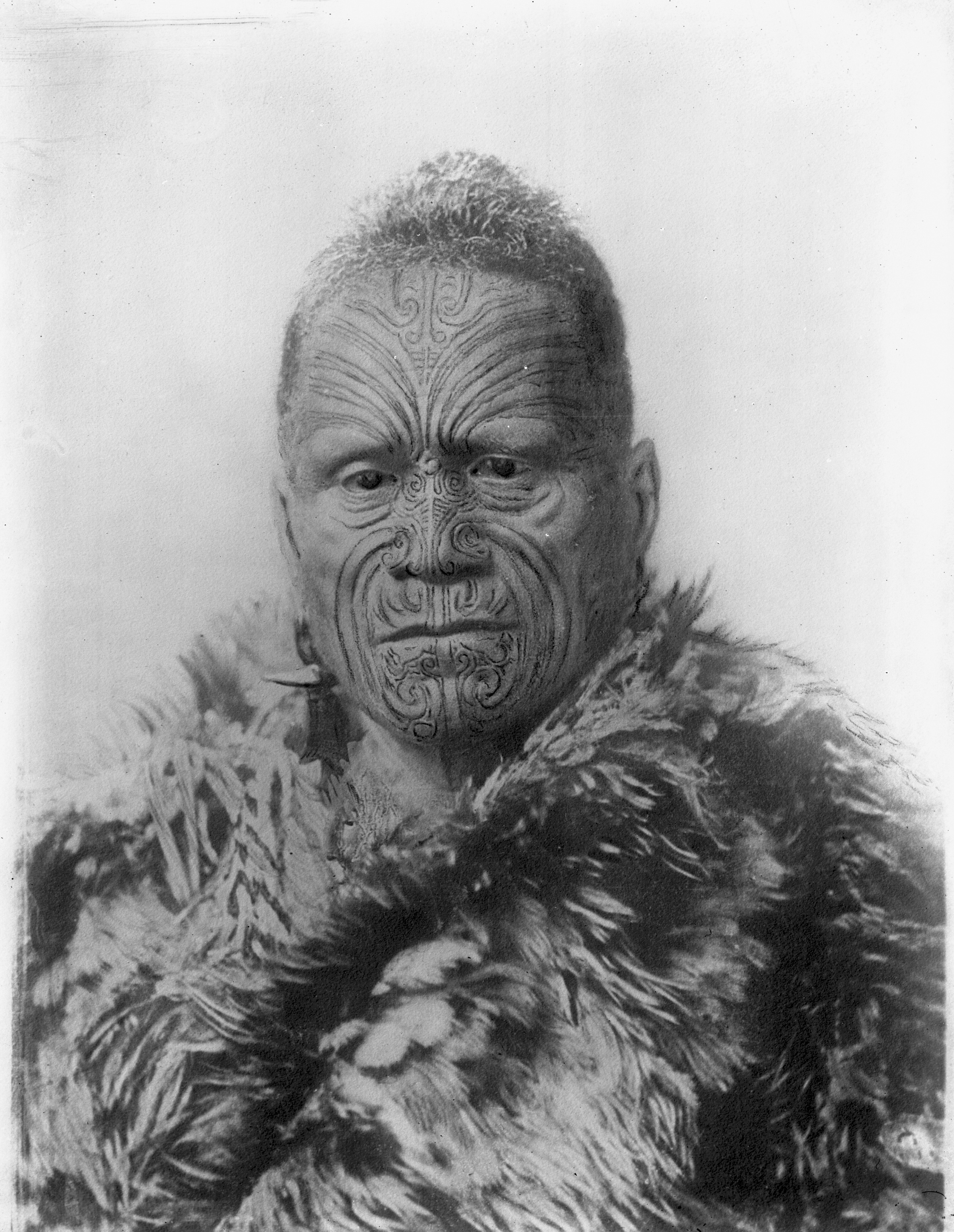
Tāwhiao, the second Māori King

However, rising tensions over disputed land purchases and attempts by Māori in the Waikato to establish what some saw as a rival to the British system of royalty – viz. the Māori King Movement (Kīngitanga) – led to the New Zealand wars in the 1860s. These conflicts started when rebel Māori attacked isolated settlers in Taranaki but were fought mainly between Crown troops – from both Britain and new regiments raised in Australia, aided by settlers and some allied Māori (known as kūpapa) – and numerous Māori groups opposed to the disputed land sales, including some Waikato Māori.

While these conflicts resulted in few Māori (compared to the earlier Musket wars) or European deaths, the colonial government confiscated tracts of tribal land as punishment for what were called rebellions. In some cases the government confiscated land from tribes that had taken no part in the war, although this was almost immediately returned. Some of the confiscated land was returned to both kupapa and "rebel" Māori. Several minor conflicts also arose after the wars, including the incident at Parihaka in 1881 and the Dog Tax War from 1897 to 1898.

The Native Land Acts of 1862 and 1865 established the Native Land Court, which was intended to transfer Māori land from communal ownership into individual household title as a means to assimilate and to facilitate greater sales to European immigrants. Māori land under individual title became available to be sold to the colonial government or to settlers in private sales. Between 1840 and 1890, Māori sold 95 per cent of their land (63,000,000 of 66,000,000 acres (270,000 km^{2}) in 1890). In total 4 per cent of this was confiscated land, although about a quarter of this was returned. 300,000 acres was returned to Kupapa Māori mainly in the lower Waikato River Basin area. Individual Māori titleholders received considerable capital from these land sales, with some lower Waikato Chiefs being given 1000 pounds each. Disputes later arose over whether or not promised compensation in some sales was fully delivered. Some claim that later, the selling off of Māori land and the lack of appropriate skills hampered Māori participation in developing the New Zealand economy, eventually diminishing the capacity of many Māori to sustain themselves.

The Māori MP Henare Kaihau, from Waiuku, who was executive head of the King Movement, worked alongside King Mahuta to sell land to the government. At that time the king sold 185,000 acres per year. In 1910 the Māori Land Conference at Waihi discussed selling a further 600,000 acres. King Mahuta had been successful in getting restitution for some blocks of land previously confiscated, and these were returned to the King in his name. Henare Kaihau invested all the money, 50,000 pounds, in an Auckland land company which collapsed; all 50,000 pounds of the Kīngitanga money was lost.

In 1884 King Tāwhiao withdrew money from the Kīngitanga bank, Te Peeke o Aotearoa, to travel to London to see Queen Victoria and try to persuade her to honour the Treaty between their peoples. He did not get past the Secretary of State for the Colonies, who said it was a New Zealand problem. Returning to New Zealand, the Premier Robert Stout insisted that all events happening before 1863 were the responsibility of the Imperial Government.

By 1891 Māori comprised just 10 per cent of the population but still owned 17 per cent of the land, although much of it was of poor quality.

== Decline and revival ==
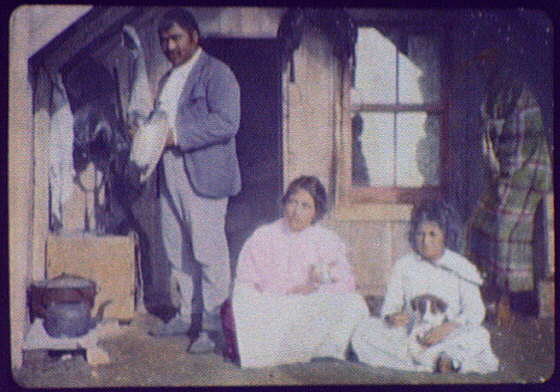
Bella, a Māori woman with her husband, child and two dogs in front of their home at Whakarewarewa, 1895

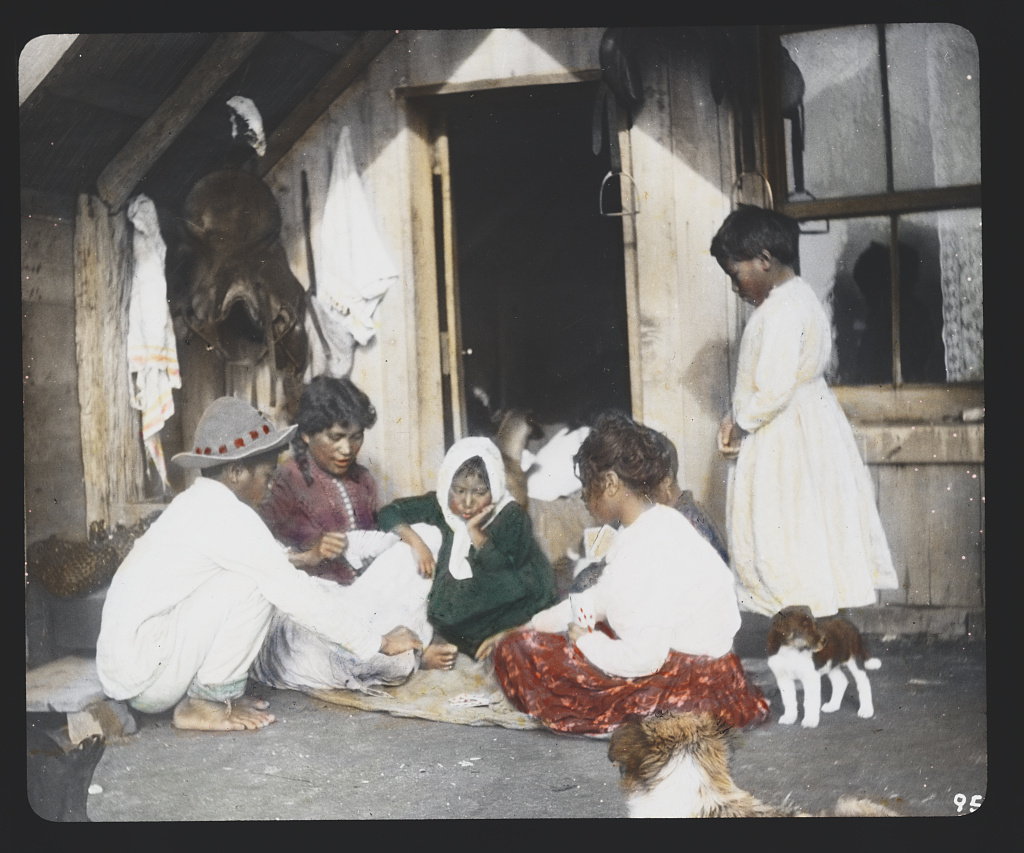
Māori woman and children playing cards on doorstep of their home, Whakarewarewa, 1895

By the late 19th century a widespread belief existed amongst both Pākehā and Māori that the Māori population would cease to exist as a separate race or culture, and become assimilated into the European population. In 1840, New Zealand had a Māori population of about 50,000 to 70,000 and only about 2,000 Europeans. By 1860 the Europeans had increased to 50,000. The Māori population had declined to 37,520 in the 1871 census, although Te Rangi Hīroa (Sir Peter Buck) believed this figure was too low. The figure was 42,113 in the 1896 census, by which time Europeans numbered more than 700,000. Professor Ian Pool noticed that as late as 1890, 40 per cent of all female Māori children who were born died before the age of one, a much higher rate than for males.

The decline of the Māori population did not continue; it stabilised and began to recover. By 1936 the Māori figure was 82,326, although the sudden rise in the 1930s was probably due to the introduction of the family benefit, payable only when a birth was registered, according to Professor Pool. Despite a substantial level of intermarriage between the Māori and European populations, many ethnic Māori retained their cultural identity. A number of discourses developed as to the meaning of "Māori" and to who counted as Māori or not.

The parliament instituted four Māori seats in 1867, giving all Māori men universal suffrage, 12 years ahead of their European New Zealand counterparts. Until the 1879 general elections, men had to satisfy property requirements of landowning or rental payments to qualify as voters: owners of land worth at least £50, or payers of a certain amount in yearly rental (£10 for farmland or a city house, or £5 for a rural house). New Zealand was thus the first neo-European nation in the world to give the vote to its indigenous people. While the Māori seats encouraged Māori participation in politics, the relative size of the Māori population of the time vis à vis Pākehā would have warranted approximately 15 seats.

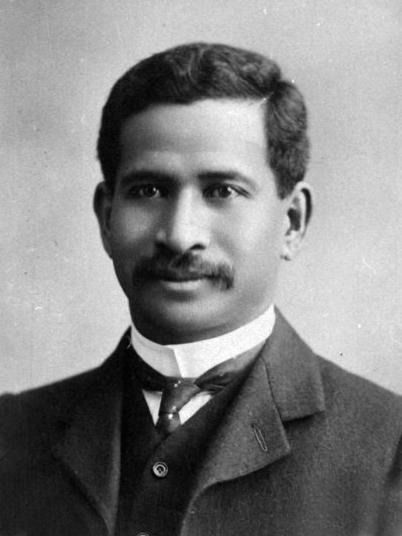
Sir Āpirana Ngata became instrumental in the revival of traditional arts such as kapa haka and carving.

From the late 19th century, successful Māori politicians such as James Carroll, Āpirana Ngata, Te Rangi Hīroa and Māui Pōmare, were influential in politics. At one point Carroll became Acting Prime Minister. The group, known as the Young Māori Party, cut across voting-blocs in Parliament and aimed to revitalise the Māori people after the devastation of the previous century. They believed the future path called for a degree of assimilation, with Māori adopting European practices such as Western medicine and education, especially learning English.

During the First World War, a Māori pioneer force was taken to Egypt but quickly was turned into a successful combat infantry battalion; in the last years of the war it was known as the "Māori Pioneer Battalion". It mainly comprised Te Arawa, Te Aitanga-a-Māhaki, Te Aitanga-a-Hauiti, Ngāti Porou and Ngāti Kahungunu and later many Cook Islanders; the Waikato and Taranaki tribes refused to enlist or be conscripted.

Māori were badly hit by the 1918 influenza epidemic when the Māori battalion returned from the Western Front. The death rate from influenza for Māori was 4.5 times higher than for Pākehā. Many Māori, especially in the Waikato, were very reluctant to visit a doctor and went to a hospital only when the patient was nearly dead. To cope with isolation, Waikato Māori, under Te Puea's leadership, increasingly returned to the old Pai Mārire (Hau hau) cult of the 1860s.

Until 1893, 53 years after the Treaty of Waitangi, Māori did not pay tax on land holdings. In 1893 a very light tax was payable only on leasehold land, and it was not till 1917 that Māori were required to pay a heavier tax equal to half that paid by other New Zealanders.

During the Second World War, the government decided to exempt Māori from the conscription that applied to other citizens. The Māori volunteered in large numbers, forming the 28th or Māori Battalion. Altogether 16,000 Māori took part in the war. Māori, including Cook Islanders, made up 12 per cent of the total New Zealand force. 3,600 served in the Māori Battalion, the remainder serving in artillery, pioneers, home guard, infantry, airforce, and navy.

== Recent history (1960s–present) ==
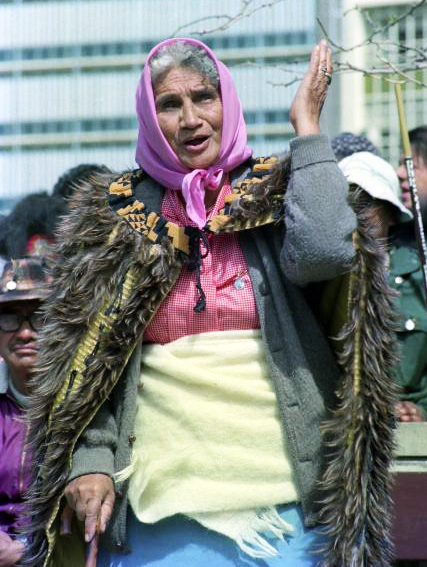
Whina Cooper leads the Māori Land March through Hamilton in 1975, seeking redress for historical grievances.

Since the 1960s, Māoridom has undergone a cultural revival concurrent with activism for social justice and a protest movement. Government recognition of the growing political power of Māori and political activism have led to limited redress for confiscation of land and for the violation of other property rights. In 1975 the Crown set up the Waitangi Tribunal, a body with the powers of a Commission of Enquiry, to investigate and make recommendations on such issues, but it cannot make binding rulings; the Government need not accept the findings of the Waitangi Tribunal, and has rejected some of them. Since 1976, people of Māori descent may choose to enrol on either the general or Māori roll for general elections, and may vote in either Māori or general electorates, but not both.

During the 1990s and 2000s, the government negotiated with Māori to provide redress for breaches by the Crown of the guarantees set out in the Treaty of Waitangi in 1840. By 2006 the government had provided over NZ$900 million in settlements, much of it in the form of land deals. The largest settlement, signed on 25 June 2008 with seven Māori iwi, transferred nine large tracts of forested land to Māori control. As a result of the redress paid to many iwi, Māori now have significant interests in the fishing and forestry industries. There is a growing Māori leadership who are using the treaty settlements as an investment platform for economic development.

Despite a growing acceptance of Māori culture in wider New Zealand society, the settlements have generated controversy. Some people have complained that the settlements occur at a level of between 1 and 2.5 cents on the dollar of the value of the confiscated lands; conversely, some denounce the settlements and socioeconomic initiatives as amounting to race-based preferential treatment. Both of these sentiments were expressed during the New Zealand foreshore and seabed controversy in 2004.

== See also ==
- Pre-Māori settlement of New Zealand theories
- Māori mythology
- History of New Zealand
- History of Oceania
