= John Dibbs =

Scottish master mariner (1790–1872)

- Captain John Dibbs, master mariner, aged about 40.
- Born: 8 November 1790; St Andrews, Fife, Scotland
- Died: 1872 (aged 81–82); Ealing, Middlesex, England
- Occupation: Sailor
- Relatives: Sir George Dibbs (son); Sir Thomas Dibbs (son)

Captain John Dibbs (8 November 1790 – 1872) was a master mariner prominent during 1822–1835 in the seas around the colony of New South Wales, New Zealand and the Society Islands (now part of Tahiti). Dibbs was master of the colonial schooner Endeavour 1822–1824, the brig Haweis 1824–1827 and the barque Lady Blackwood 1827–1834. He is credited as the European discoverer of Rarotonga and several other islands. Most of his voyages involved the transporting of missionaries, trade, whaling and seal hunting. He was believed for over 170 years to have disappeared at sea in 1835. He was the father of Sir George Dibbs, a pre-Federation Australian politician, Sir Thomas Dibbs, an Australian banker, and John Campbell Dibbs, a successful Sydney businessman.

== Early years ==
Very few verifiable facts are known. Dibbs was born and educated in St Andrews, Fife, Scotland. His parents were John Dibbs and Elizabeth Simpson and he was one of several children. His father, uncle and grandfather served in the military prior to his birth.

== Maritime training ==
It is very likely he trained as a midshipman through the Marine Society around 1806. The East India Company College (Hertford Heath, near Hertford) started in 1806, and trained 16- to 18-year-olds, and if so Dibbs would have been one of the earliest intakes of students. He would have graduated to the East India Company Maritime Service in 1808. His activities 1808–1818 are unknown, but there are two general possibilities.

In 1808 at age 18, he graduates and becomes eligible for posting as a midshipman. Reportedly 25% of Scottish males served in the military between 1792 and 1815, so it is possible (given his father's and grandfather's military service) that Dibbs joined the Royal Navy that was then involved with the War of 1812 and Napoleonic Wars. After Napoleon's final defeat in 1815 at Waterloo the British economy went into recession, and there were thousands of ex-navy seamen out of work.

There is however no record of a Lieutenant Dibbs (or variant spellings) in the Royal Navy.

The idea that Dibbs was in the Royal Navy comes from a story first published in 1865 detailing an 1828 voyage to England in a ship, the Lady Mary, under the command of a Captain Dibbs, a former Royal Navy lieutenant, and how he outwitted pirates off the coast of Brazil.

Merchant Marine officer grade promotions usually required a two-year tour at sea. Hence it is reasonable to assume that ...

- John graduated from midshipman to 6th officer about 1810.
- John is promoted to 5th officer about 1812.
- John is promoted to 4th officer about 1814.
- John is promoted to 3rd officer about 1816.

Scottish immigration to Canada peaked in 1819. Dibbs is listed as the master of the Rothiemurchus, a ship rated at 322 tons owned by John Watson & Co, Leith, in March 1818. The Rothiemurchus made trips to Quebec in 1816 and 1817 (John was probably 1st officer), again in March 1818, and was wrecked in September 1818 in the Baltic on her way in ballast to St. Petersburgh, after leaving Leith on 3 September 1818. She ended up on the Naas Reef, near Wisby, Gotland, when "driven on shore" on 15 September.

The vessel last appeared in the Lloyd's Registers in 1818, but she does not feature between 1812 and 1815, and part of the explanation is that this was not the name under which she originally sailed. Previously launched and known as The Bell of London, she was evidently owned by the Admiralty as a supply vessel or transport but she was advertised as up for sale prior to the Congress of Vienna and Wellington's subsequent campaign in Europe.

This sale did not result in a buyer, and "the Rothiemurchus of London" was re-advertised as for sale in Edinburgh on 18 October 1815, and was now "presently lying in the harbour of Leith", although her former name was no longer mentioned. This time she was "set up at the sum of three thousand pounds Sterling", presumably the reserve price. Again she did not sell, and was again advertised for sale on 8 November, this time set up at £2500. By 26 February 1816 "the New Ship Rothiemurchus" had indeed found a new master, George Watson, and was advertised as ready to receive goods, and bound for Quebec in early April.

Dibbs joined the Westmoreland in Leith, Scotland, as 2nd officer in 1820. (Note: Westmoreland, of 415 tons (bm), had been launched in 1817 at Hull. The advertisements for her voyage described her as only two years old and of 600 tons burthen.) The Westmoreland (Captain Potton) transported immigrants and cargo from Leith to South Africa, then to Sydney via Hobart, the Bay of Islands in New Zealand and Tahiti. She was one of 26 immigrant ships that embarked some 4000 persons under the Albany Settlement Scheme of 1820, the aim being to settle them in South Africa. On the Westmoreland were Rev. Thomas Kendall, the Maori chieftains Waitkato and Hongi Hika, to whom King George IV had given a suit of armour. While in England Hongi Hika had also negotiated a large quantity of muskets and ammunition for land from the French adventurer Baron Charles de Thierry who shipped them to Sydney. These munitions fundamentally changed the balance of power in Maori New Zealand.

Waitkato and Hongi Hika and their armaments were landed in New Zealand in July 1821, and the Westmoreland continued north east to Tahiti for extra cargo and passengers (notably Rev. John Williams, before heading to Sydney.

== Arrival in New South Wales ==
On his arrival in Sydney in 1821 on the Westmoreland Dibbs became acquainted with Robert Campbell Sr. (of the Sydney traders Campbell & Co), his sons, John (20), Robert (18) and Rev. John Williams of the London Missionary Society (LMS) on the incoming voyage from Otaheite (Tahiti) and New Zealand in 1821.

Campbell and Williams offered him command of the schooner Endeavour to trade in the Tahiti region. During this time, while ferring Rev. Williams around the islands, Dibbs became acquainted with René Primevère Lesson and Jules de Blosseville of the French royal corvette Coquille, on a hydrographic expedition. In May 1823, John and Jules de Blosseville, on the Endeavour returned to Maupiti Island to map it for the Coquille expedition. On 25 July 1823, Captain Dibbs (re)discovered Armstrong Island (now called Rarotonga), and nearby islands Mitiero and Mauke.

In March 1824, the Russian Hydrographic Service mission under Otto von Kotzebue stayed in Otaheite for 10 days, and met with Dibbs.

Dibbs was also present in Otahiete for the coronation of King Pomare III on 21 April 1824, before heading to Sydney with cargo and a group of missionaries, notably George Bennet and Daniel Tyerman.

On 16 July 1824 on the voyage to Sydney from Tahiti, the crew and passengers stopped in Whangaroa Harbour, near where a Wesleyan mission was located at Kaeo. An altercation with the local Maori Ngāti Pou tribe resulted in an incident where Maori warriors took control of the Endeavour and menaced the crew. The situation was defused by the timely arrival of another Maori chieftain, Ngāti Uru chief Te Ara. The incident was initially described by Rev. Tyerman as a mostly a problem of cultural differences, but in later years the story became a perilous cannibal adventure that defined the Maori (to European readers) as barbarian savages.

The Endeavour finally returned to Sydney in mid August 1824.

Dibbs was appointed the London Missionary Society Master of Ships for the Pacific station and served in this capacity until 1827.

In March 1825, he was given command of the Campbell & Co brig Haweis (from Captain Jamison) and ferried missionaries around New Zealand and Tahiti, and also traded, until mid-1827.

The Haweis made a voyage to Mauritius (off the east coast of Africa) in early 1827 – April 1827, selling the cargo of sugar in Hobart on the return voyage. The vessel appears to have been under the command of the 1st officer, a Mr. Doyle, as Dibbs was still in Otaheite, and rejoined the Haweis in Hobart.

In June 1827, in Launceston on the return voyage from Hobart to Sydney, Dibbs assaulted a river pilot, one John Williams, who filed a formal complaint. In the court document it is stated that the Haweis had a crew of Tahitians, and Dibbs was fluent enough in their language to be able to command them. The court document ends by stating that the accused was "not apprehended, effected his escape".

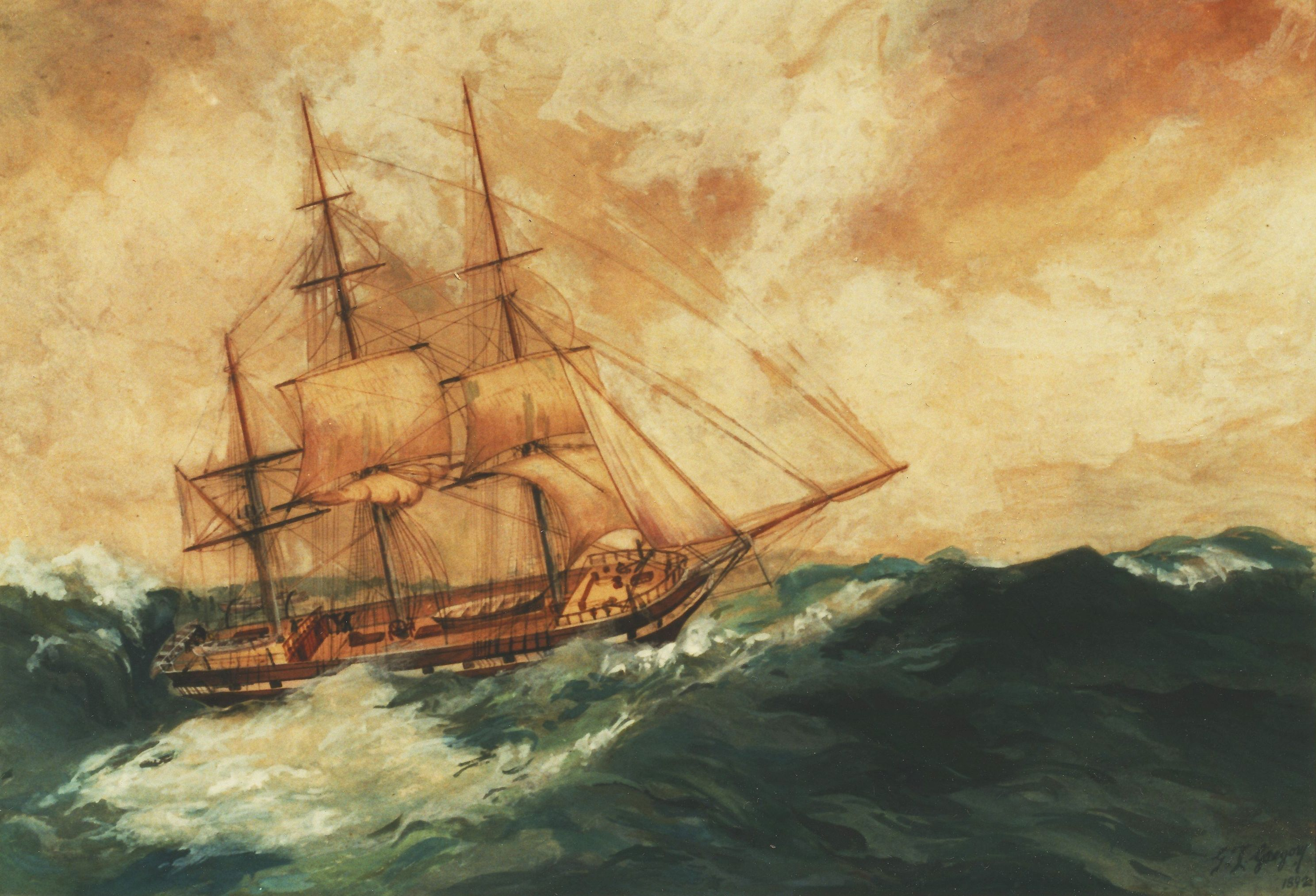
The Lady Blackwood scudding through the Bay of Biscay. Painting by George Gregory, 1892.

In 1821 Campbell & Co had acquired the barque Lady Blackwood in Calcutta. Dibbs handed the Haweis over to Captain John James around September 1827, and on 29 September, departed for Calcutta to take command of the Lady Blackwood. He arrived in Calcutta from Singapore on the Donna Carmelita, listed as on Country Service (i.e. as an East India company employee), and returned to Sydney in mid April 1828.

His first trading voyage in the Lady Blackwood was to Valparaíso, Chile, May–November 1828, returning with a cargo of wheat, barley, other grains and some breeding mares.

== Marriages ==
The London Missionary Society records that at Raiatea (now Tahiti), "25 Aug 1825, Mary, wife of John Dibbys, Master schooner Haweis, died in childbirth." There is no other known information on Mary, but it is most probable that she was from Sydney or New Zealand, and they would have been married by mid-1824. She may have been the daughter of an LMS missionary, as Dibbs transported many of them with families around the region. Shipping records indicate that the Haweis was on a return voyage to Sydney from Tahiti in August 1825.

In December 1828 Dibbs married Sophia Allwright (19) the daughter of convicts Thomas Allwright and Sophia Langford, in Sydney, and took her back to St. Andrews in early 1829 on the Lady Blackwood. A son, John (the most likely name), was born prematurely soon after arrival in London in August 1829 but died after 6 hours. They had three other sons, John Campbell (born 1830), Thomas Allwright (born 1833) and George Richard (born 1834), all who became prominent in the colony before federation. An unnamed daughter (born 1832) is believed to have died soon after birth as no baptismal record is extant.

== "Disappearance at Sea", and the real story ==
For generations, it was thought and always said by the family that Dibbs disappeared at sea in 1835, and was never heard of again. It was only in 2009 that part of the true story finally emerged when records from the HEIC archives were located in London.

Examination of shipping records between 1829 and 1833 show that Dibbs was engaged mostly in the seal and whaling trade in the Lady Blackwood. During his last voyage, something happened which caused major personality changes and he was diagnosed with "mania furiosa", with symptoms of uncontrollable rages. The most likely cause is a severe head injury, such as a depressed skull fracture. He and Sophia lived apart for a few months, and then when his condition became unmanageable, the East India Company (through the assistance of John Campbell) arranged for him to be transferred to the company asylum in Calcutta run by Dr. Isaac Beardsmore, then later to another facility in London.

Aug 1835 Dibbs departs for Calcutta aboard the Africaine, restrained in his cabin. He appears to have been accompanied or escorted by a Captain Carew.

Nov 1837 Dibbs is shipped to England aboard the Catherine at a cost of Rs. 600. He was reportedly so uncontrollable that he had to be placed in a straight jacket.

The 1841 census in England lists John Dibbs, born in Scotland around 1790, in an East India Company Asylum, Pembroke House, in London. He was described as a naval officer. Dibbs and his wife Elizabeth Simpson had a son John who was baptised on 14 November 1790 in St Andrews and St Leonards, Scotland, for whom no other records have been found. East India Company records show John Dibbs, a ship’s captain, as a patient in the lunatic Asylum of Isaac Beardsmore in Calcutta, India in 1835. He was diagnosed with 'mania furiosa'. After many letters to the Governor of Bengal, a passage to London was arranged in June 1837 on the Catherine. It was hoped that the better climate there would effect an improvement in his health. His former place of abode was 'unknown' but he himself stated that he was born in St Andrews, Scotland, that his father was a grocer and alive in 1829 and that his wife and children were in Sydney, where he had property.

Dibbs spent the next 37 years in the care of the East India Company, moving with them to their new Royal India Asylum in Ealing, London. He died aged 81 in 1872. His death certificate states that he had dementia for 37 years, an enlarged prostate and the cause of death seems to have been urania poisoning.

Dibbs was buried from the Royal India Asylum, Ealing, in the South Ealing Cemetery.

== Captain Dibbs' ships ==
Schooner Endeavour, about 50 tons, crew 8–11.

One of the first ships built in Sydney, in 1804 by James Underwood. It was first used for trading between Port Jackson, New Zealand, and Tahiti, and was gifted by the London Missionary Society to Tamatoa II, King of Raiatea. In 1812, the master was Captain Theodore Walker. In 1822 it was sold to Rev. John Williams, who after getting into financial difficulties sold it in 1824 to John Campbell of Campbell and Co.

In the Sydney Gazette 6 February 1823, Robert Brimer (1st), William Wood, Francisco Preto and seven Tahitians are listed as crew. On 29 January 1824, Robert Brimer, John Smith, Francisco Preto and four Tahitians are listed as crew.

Captain Dibbs remained as master until September 1824, when he took command of the Haweis. Robert Brimer, the 1st Officer, took command of the Endeavour.

Schooner/brig Haweis 72 tons, crew 6–8. Seems to have had a cargo capacity of around 45 tons.

The 72-ton, wooden schooner / brig Haweis was built at Moʼorea, Society Islands (Tahiti) for the London Missionary Society by the missionaries George Bignall and John Williams. The vessel was launched in December 1817 by King Pōmare II of Tahiti and named after Dr. Thomas Haweis, whose interests led to the founding of the London Missionary Society.

The Haweis proved to be unsuitable for the intended use, being to trade and procure supplies for both the Tahitian and New Zealand missions.

In November 1828 Haweis departed Sydney for the Antipodes and Bounty Islands, where a sealing gang was left. Gangs were often stationed on remote islands to cull as many seals as they could before the ships returned. Sealing was dangerous enough, but added to it was the very distinct possibility that their ship might never return.

Sealers were crushed to death by seals, attacked, killed and eaten by Maori, and abandoned to starve by captains that could not, or did not, return. After Haweis left her gang in the southern islands, she continued her voyage trading around New Zealand and called at the Bay of Islands in December to refresh. While at the Bay of Islands an interpreter was enlisted to assist in trading with Māori. They then sailed for the East Cape. In March 1828 the Haweis was attacked and looted at Whakatane, in the Bay of Plenty, with three crewmen killed. The ship was retaken a couple of days later by Captain Clarke of the New Zealander, and Haweis arrived back at the Bay of Islands after her harrowing ordeal on 15 March. Haweis' sealing gang must have been more fortunate that others, as when the brig arrived back in Sydney in April, seal skins were among her cargo. This success saw Haweis sail to the sealing grounds in the south again the following month and when she arrived back in Sydney on 29 June from Stewart Island, her crew had taken another 340 seal skins. Haweis' next voyage was an eight-day return trip from Sydney to Newcastle, still under Captain John James. On 24 October 1829 James left Sydney on Haweis, bound for the Society Islands. By the following January grave fears were held for her safety.

In 1835, a report appeared that the Haweis has been taken over by escaping convicts, and the crew and passengers murdered.

Sydney Herald 25 August 1835: "After the brig had got fairly out to sea they came from their various places of concealment in the vessel, murdered the captain and the passengers and all those of the crew who would not join them in taking the vessel.

They reached the Navigators and ran the vessel on one of the islands and broke her up. Since then the murderers have been living on the same island. Capt Charlton sent over by the first conveyance dispatches to this effect to the Admiral on the South American coast. When we reflect upon the number of vessels that are continually being missed from the port of Sydney we cannot but infer that many of them have no doubt followed the fate of the Haweis and the unfortunate passengers and crew."

Barque "Lady Blackwood"

Built at Fort Gloucester, Bengal, 1821, 253 tons. Hull and planks made of teak. Length 92 feet, beam 26 feet.

Two decks, three masts. Crew : 12–15

Rowan Hackman in "Ships of the East India Company" lists a LADY BLACKWOOD, 263 tons burden, built at Calcutta in 1821 for Cockerill & Co. She was licensed by the HEIC under the system which existed after the Company lost its monopoly of trade to India in 1813.

The first master was Captain Hall (of Blackheath, Kent), and on the first voyage was jury rigged (after being dismasted in a typhoon) from Philippine Islands to Sandwich Islands (Hawaii) to coast of northern California where the Russian American Fur Company had a station and made sufficient repairs for her to proceed to Mexico.

That's a journey of 6,000/10,000 miles without masts or rigging.

In August 1822, the Lady Blackwood (Capt Russell) arrived from Mexico and Singapore. The Lady Blackwood was acquired by Campbell and Co. in 1827, and Capt Dibbs departed Sydney for Calcutta, 29 September 1827 to take command from a Captain Lamb.

Captain Dibbs made two successful whaling voyages in command of the vessel between 1830 and 1833.

The Lady Blackwood was sold in 1849 to San Francisco interests, sold again by the US Marshal in 1858 for $1700, and wrecked off the coast of British Columbia around 1872. The ship's bell was recovered a few years later by Reverend Jules Xavier Willemar and his parishioners, and to this day is the church bell at St. Andrew's Anglican Church in Courtenay, British Columbia.
