= Westmoreland (1817 ship) =

History

United Kingdom
- Name: Westmoreland
- Builder: Hull
- Launched: 1817
- Fate: Condemned October 1845

General characteristics
- Tons burthen: 415, or 420 (bm)
- Sail plan: Ship-rigged; later Barque

Westmoreland was a ship launched at Hull in 1817. She sailed to India under a license from the British East India Company (EIC). Next, she sailed to Australia with passengers. From Sydney she visited New Zealand, Tahiti, and Valparaiso, before returning to England. She then traded widely, to Russia, North America, West Africa, and India again. She was condemned at Saint Helena on 29 October 1845 as she was returning from the coast of Africa.

== Career ==
In 1813 the EIC had lost its monopoly on the trade between India and Britain. British ships were then free to sail to India or the Indian Ocean under a license from the EIC. Westmoreland first appeared in Lloyd's Register (LR) in 1818 (the LR volume for 1817, if any, is not available on line), and already showed her sailing to India. Westmoreland, Cope, master, sailed for Bengal on 21 April 1818. She arrived at Madeira on 8 May 1818 and sailed on 15 May for Bengal.

Year	Master	Owner	Trade	Source & notes
1818	J.Cope	Hewitson	Hull–Calcutta	LR
1820	J.Cope; J.Potton	Hewitson	London–Calcutta; London–Cape of Good Hope	LR
1821	J.Cope; J.Potton	Hewitson	Leith–New South Wales	LR; repairs 1820

In 1820 Westmoreland's owners advertised that she would leave Leith on 1 November, call at Portsmouth, and sail to the Cape of Good Hope, Van Diemen's Land, and Sydney. The advertisements described her as "2 years old", and of "600 tons". They also described her as having excellent accommodations for passengers and that she would have an experienced surgeon on board. Her second officer was John Dibbs, who would leave her at Sydney to become a prominent mariner in the area. Westmoreland was at Portsmouth on 29 November and left for Van Diemen's Land on 14 December. She left the Cape on 23 March 1821.

Westmoreland arrived at Hobart, Van Diemen's Land, on 5 May 1821 with 41 passengers. She arrived at Port Jackson on 31 May. She sailed from Port Jackson on 4 July, bound for New Zealand and Otaheiti.

Passengers on Westmoreland on her voyage from Sydney to New Zealand included Rev. Thomas Kendall, and the Maori chieftains Waitkato and Hongi Hika, to whom King George IV had gifted a suit of armour. While in England Hongi Hika had also negotiated a large quantity of muskets and ammunition for land from the French adventurer Baron Charles de Thierry who shipped them to Sydney. These munitions fundamentally changed the balance of power in Maori New Zealand. Waitkato and Hongi Hika and their armaments landed in New Zealand in July 1821, and Westmoreland continued north east to Tahiti for extra cargo and passengers. The missionary Rev. John Williams arrived at Aitutaki on 26 October 1821 on board her. She then sailed to Sydney, where she arrived on 12 December. She sailed for New Zealand again on 2 February 1822.

Westmoreland sailed from the Society Islands on 12 August 1822. She reached Valparaiso on 2 December, and Saint Helena on 19 February 1823. She arrived at Falmouth on 27 April 1823 and sailed for London two days later and was at Portsmouth on 3 May. She finally arrived at Gravesend on 11 May.

Year	Master	Owner	Trade	Source & notes
1823	J.Potton; Bingham	Hewitson	Leith–New South Wales; London–Petersburg	LR; repairs 1820
1824	Bingham; Webster	Hewitson	London–Petersburg	LR; repairs 1820

On 1 September [O.S. 20 August] 1823 Westmoreland, Bingham, master, rescued the crew of Traveller, which had upset off Hogland two hours earlier; Traveller sank shortly thereafter.

Year	Master	Owner	Trade	Source & notes
1825	A.Webster	Hewitson	Liverpool–Charleston	LR; repairs 1820
1826	G.Clark	Hewitson	Liverpool–Quebec	LR; repairs 1820 and 1826
1828	G.Clark; T.Neil	Hewitson	Liverpool–Ireland	LR; repairs 1820 and 1826
1834	T.Knill	Hewitson	Hull–Quebec	LR

In 1834 Westmoreland, Knill, master, was sailing from Quebec to Harwich when she grounded on Crosslands and had to be assisted in leaky.

Year	Master	Owner	Trade	Source & notes
1836	T.Knill	W.Ward	Hull–Quebec; Hull–Sierra Leone	LR; damages repaired 1835 & small repairs 1836
1839	T.Knill; J.Todrig; Emery	W.Ward	London–Bermuda; Hull–Bombay	LR; damages repaired 1835 & small repairs 1836
1844	W.Emery; Harrison	W.Ward	Hull–Bombay; Liverpool-Icheboe	LR; damages repaired 183, small repairs 1836, & large repairs 1840

On 5 July 1844 Westmoreland, Emery, master, put into Mauritius leaky. She had to discharge part of her cargo. She had left Bombay on 29 March, and she left Mauritius on 4 August and Saint Helena on 9 September. She arrived back in Liverpool in late November.

Next, she sailed to Ichaboe Island, which was undergoing a "white gold" rush. Hundreds of vessels converged on the island to pick up cargoes of guano.

== Fate ==
Westmoreland was returning to London from the coast of Africa when she put into Saint Helena. On 29 October 1845 she was condemned there. LR for 1846 carried the annotation "LOST" beneath her name.
