= Turikatuku =

Turikatuku (c. 1773–1827) was a New Zealand Māori tribal leader who was the senior wife of the Ngāpuhi chief and war leader Hongi Hika. She was said to be his main adviser, whom he took whenever he travelled or conducted war campaigns, during the Musket Wars.

== Biography ==
Turikatuku was the daughter of Mutunga II, and belonged to Te Hikutū and Ngāti Rēhia, who were related to Ngāpuhi; their territories stretched from Te Puna and Rangihoua in the Bay of Islands north towards Whangaroa. She and her younger sister Tangiwhare became wives of Hongi Hika. Turikatuku was his senior wife, and the mother of at least two of his children, a son Hāre Hongi and a daughter Rongo, later given the Christian name of Hariata, who was to become the wife first of Hōne Heke and then of Ārama Karaka Pī. About 1816, Turikatuku had an inflammation of the eyes and went completely blind, but the impairment did not prevent her from carrying out her usual tasks.

It is said that Turikatuku was Hongi's main adviser and that he took her whenever he travelled or conducted war campaigns. She accompanied him on his three great war expeditions against tribes in the Coromandel and Hauraki Gulf, Waikato and Bay of Plenty between 1821 and 1823. During a campaign against Ngāti Whātua in 1825, at the Battle of Te Ika-ā-ranganui, Turikatuku gave a speech to encourage the warriors. During the battle, her son Hāre Hongi was shot dead. Ngāpuhi won a complete victory, greatly expanding their territory.

When Hongi launched a campaign against Ngāti Pou at Whangaroa in December 1826, Turikatuku was very ill, but Hongi insisted she accompany him. She died at Whangaroa in around January 1827 and was buried there, with Hongi intending to later take her bones to Waimate North.
