= Royal India Asylum =

Coordinates: 51.50620°N 0.34980°W

The Royal India Asylum was a lunatic asylum operated by the Secretary of State for India at Ealing between 1870 and 1892.

The asylum occupied Elm Grove in Ealing. The Entrance Lodge was on the south-west corner of Ealing Common.

== Overview ==
In March 1870, the Secretary of State for India bought the Elm Grove estate from the Perceval family for £24,500. Sir Matthew Digby Wyatt then oversaw the conversion of the property into a lunatic asylum for patients sent home from British India. The new Royal Indian Asylum opened in August 1870, taking in patients previously looked after in the East India Company’s Asylum at Pembroke House, London. One such was Captain John Dibbs (1790–1872).

In 1874 the India Office was given notice that the proposed Hounslow and Metropolitan Railway was to run through the grounds of the Asylum. An Act to give effect to this was enacted in 1878, with provisions to protect the interests of the Royal Indian Asylum: a compulsory purchase was limited to no more than two acres, unless the Secretary of State consented; the railway would go through the grounds in cutting; a bridge and road over the cutting were to be built and maintained; and the railway was to be fenced off.

Negotiations between the India Office and the railway centred on the price to be paid for the land, the position of the bridge, and the fencing. Dr Thomas Christie, the Superintendent of the Asylum, was consulted about the protection to be given to patients. It was agreed that an iron railing would serve the purpose and look better than the high brick wall planned by the railway company. Christie believed that patients were less likely to climb an open railing than a wall they could not see over. Bars should be vertical, except at the top and bottom, to discourage climbing. The land was conveyed in 1881.

The asylum closed in 1892. After Leopold de Rothschild had bought the estate for building, Elm Grove was demolished in 1894.

== See also ==
- Map from 1888
