= A korao no New Zealand =

1815 book by Thomas Kendall

A korao no New Zealand; or, the New Zealander's First Book
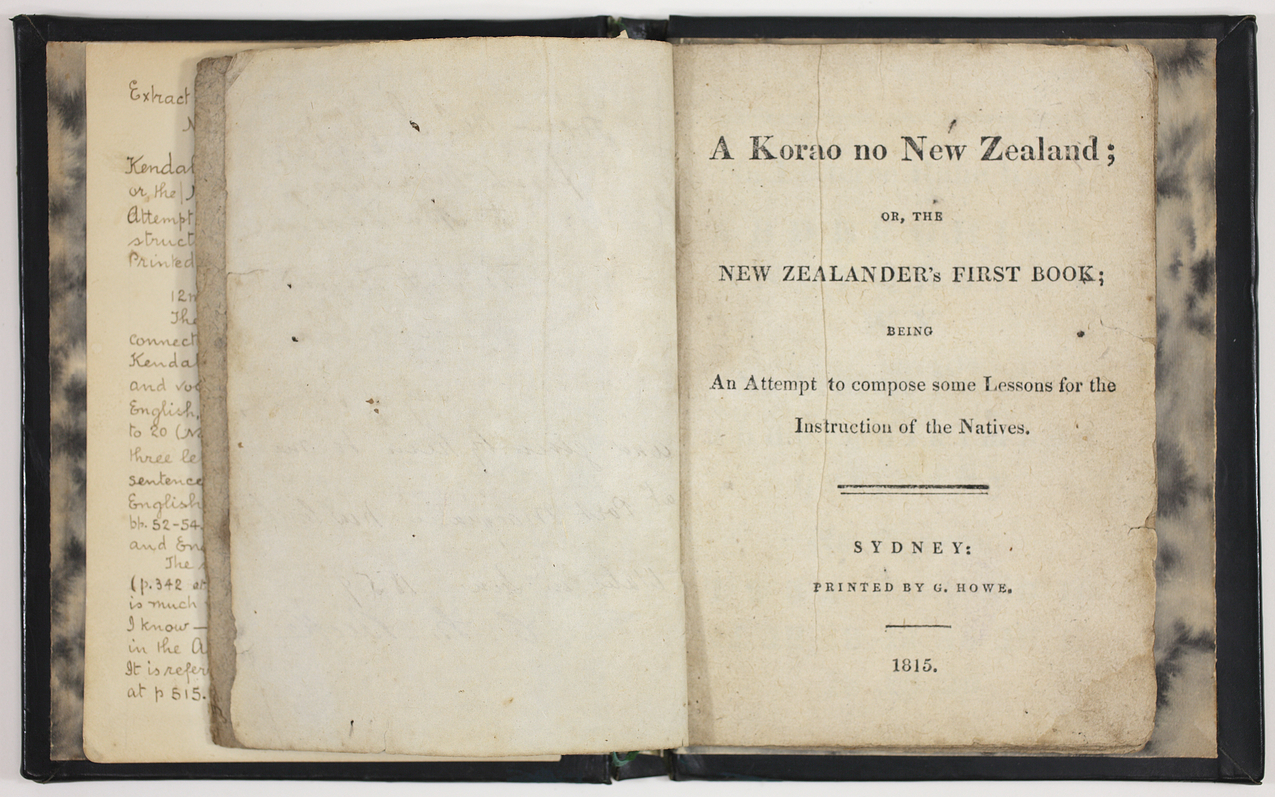
- Author: Thomas Kendall
- Language: English; Māori
- Subject: Māori language
- Genre: Primer
- Publisher: George Howe
- Publication date: 1815
- Publication place: Colony of New South Wales
- Media type: Print

A korao no New Zealand; or, the New Zealander's First Book is an 1815 Christian primer written by Anglican missionary Thomas Kendall, and is the first book written in the Māori language. The full title is A korao no New Zealand, or, The New Zealander's First Book: being an attempt to compose some lessons for the instruction of the natives. The word korao would today be written kōrero.

A korao was written as an aid to educate Māori children and convert them to Christianity. It features phrases, word lists and religious instruction. The children would recite the alphabet and syllables, in hopes of learning reading and writing. Te Ara: The Encyclopedia of New Zealand describes the book as "very basic and full of errors".

Kendall sent the manuscript to the missionary Samuel Marsden, who was based in Parramatta. Marsden had 200 copies printed in Sydney in 1815 by George Howe. The only known extant copy is held by Auckland War Memorial Museum. The museum purchased the copy in February 1894 for £N.Z.1-15-0 (equivalent to $369 in 2026) after an initial offering of £N.Z.5 (equivalent to $1,054 in 2026) In his A Bibliography of the Literature Relating to New Zealand published in 1909, Thomas Hocken listed the book size as duodecimo (12mo), bound in "strong brown paper" and containing 54 pages.

In 2014, the book was added to the Memory of the World Aotearoa New Zealand Ngā Mahara o te Ao register by UNESCO. A korao no New Zealand was recognised as one of the 180 most significant works of Māori-authored non-fiction through inclusion in the 2025 Books of Mana. The authors of the list recognised that, although Kendall was not Māori, the book could not have been produced without substantial input from unrecognised Māori contributors.
