= Samuel Lee (linguist) =

English Orientalist and linguist

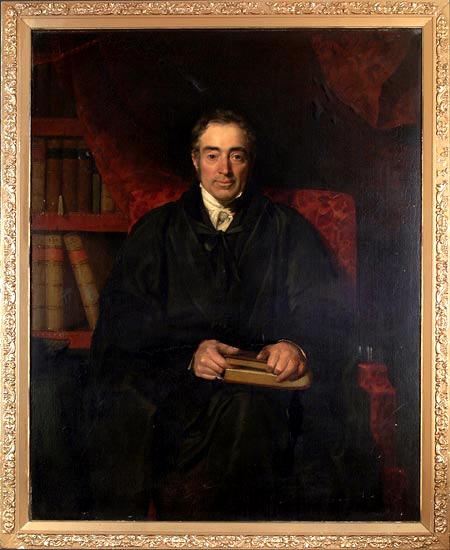
Samuel Lee

Samuel Lee (14 May 1783 – 16 December 1852) was an English Orientalist, born in Shropshire; professor at Cambridge, first of Arabic and then of Hebrew language; was the author of a Hebrew grammar and lexicon, and a translation of the Book of Job.

== Biography ==
Born of poor parents at Longnor, a Shropshire village 8 miles from Shrewsbury, Samuel Lee received a charity school education and at age twelve became a carpenter's apprentice in Shrewsbury. He was fond of reading and acquired knowledge of a number of languages. An early marriage caused him to reduce the time devoted to his studies, but the accidental loss of his tools caused him to become a school teacher, giving private lessons in Persian and Hindustani.

His remarkable linguistic abilities eventually brought him to the notice of the Church Missionary Society, which paid for his education at Cambridge University. He entered Queens' College, Cambridge, in 1813. He graduated B.A. in 1818, and proceeded M.A. in 1819, B.D. in 1827, and D.D. in 1833.

In 1819, he became professor of Arabic at Cambridge. Building on the work of the Church Missionary Society missionary Thomas Kendall (Note: From 1814, missionaries tried to define the sounds of the language. Thomas Kendall published a book in 1815 entitled A korao no New Zealand, which in modern orthography and usage would be He Kōrero nō Aotearoa. Professor Samuel Lee, working with chief Hongi Hika[40] and Hongi's junior relative Waikato at Cambridge University, established a definitive orthography based on Northern usage in 1820. Lee's orthography continues in use) and New Zealand chiefs Hongi Hika, Tītore and others he helped create the first dictionary of te Reo, the Māori language. This book, A Grammar and Vocabulary of the Language of New Zealand, was published in 1820.

His translations from the Bible and other religious works into Arabic and other languages helped to launch the missionary activities of the Evangelical movement in the first half of the 19th century.

At the 15 November 1819 foundational meeting of the Cambridge Philosophical Society, the Society committee elected William Farish as president with Adam Sedgwick and Lee as secretaries. In 1829, he translated and annotated The Travels of Ibn Battuta with the help of a previous translation by Johann Gottfried Ludwig Kosegarten. In 1823 he became chaplain of Cambridge gaol, in 1825 rector of Bilton-with-Harrogate, Yorkshire, and in 1831 Regius Professor of Hebrew, a position he held until 1848. In 1831 he also became vicar of Banwell, Somerset and remained vicar there until he resigned in June 1838 to become rector of Barley, Hertfordshire, where he died on 16 December 1852, aged sixty-nine.

In 1823 he published a version of the Peshitta which was often reprinted and was the most accessible text for a long time. He claimed to draw upon earlier manuscripts, but Lee did not specify his sources, nor how he had used them, and his text offers very few corrections to that of the Peshitta editions of the Paris and London Polyglots.

He was married twice.

== Notes ==
Attribution

- Hamilton, Thomas (1892). "Lee, Samuel (1783-1852)" . In Lee, Sidney (ed.). Dictionary of National Biography. Vol. 32. London: Smith, Elder & Co. pp. 378–9.
