= Waikato (rangatira) =

Ngāpuhi leader (1790?–1877)

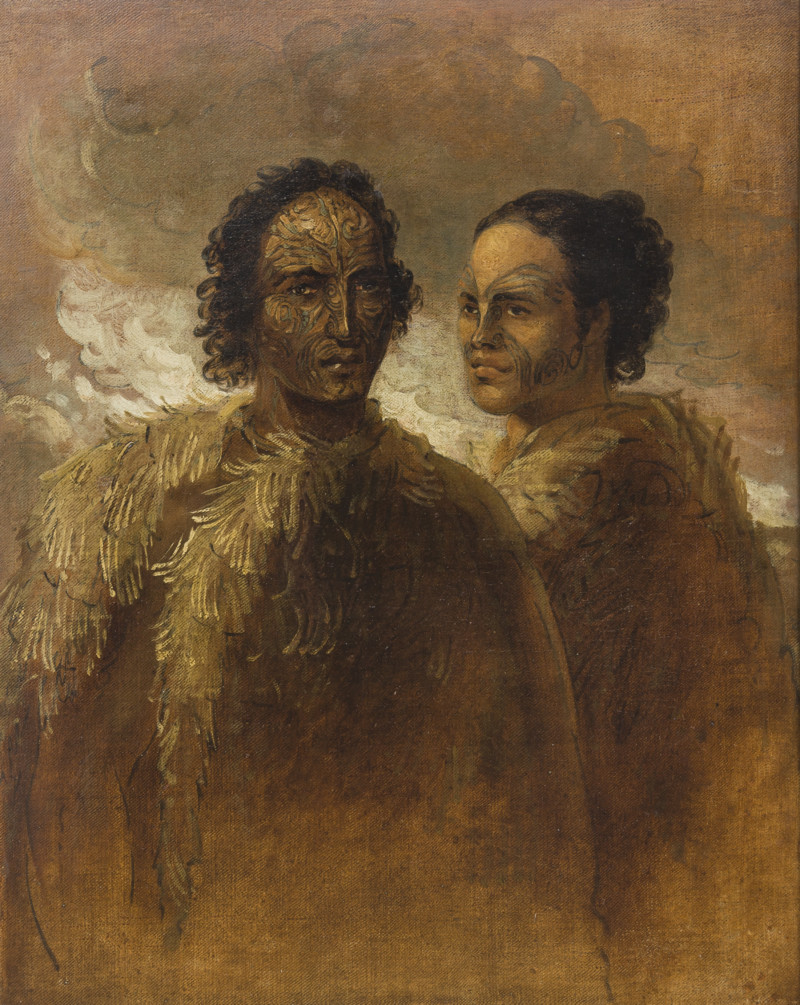
Hongi Hika (left) and Waikato (right)

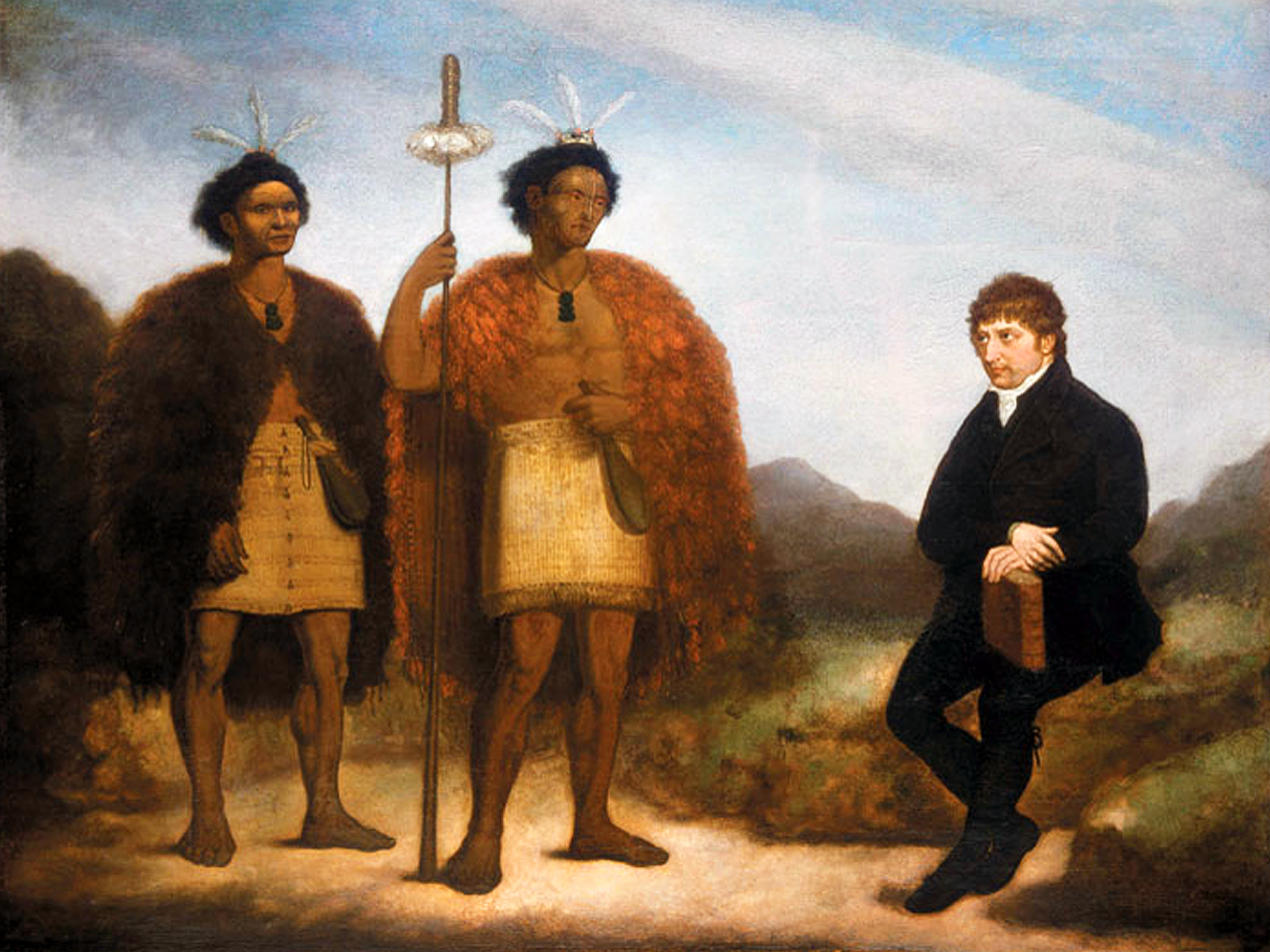
Waikato (left), Hongi Hika, and Anglican missionary Thomas Kendall in a 1820 painting

Waikato (c. 1790 – 17 September 1877), sometimes known as Waikato Piriniha or Prince Waikato, also known as Hohaia Parata or Hohaia Parati, was a tribal leader (rangatira) of the Ngāpuhi and Te Hikutū iwi (tribes). Waikato's primary residence was the pā at Rangihoua Bay.

As a young man, Waikato travelled to England in 1820 alongside the principal Ngāpuhi chief Hongi Hika and the missionary Thomas Kendall. Hongi Hika and Waikato had assisted Kendall with developing a written form of the Māori language and in England, they worked with the linguist Samuel Lee at the University of Cambridge in the preparation of a grammar and vocabulary of the language. The chiefs had an audience with King George IV.
