= Charles de Thierry =

Dutch adventurer

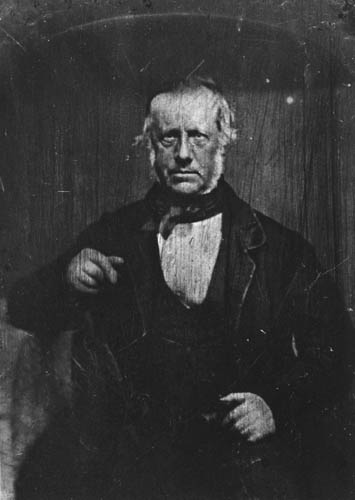
- A photograph of Charles de Thierry, probably taken after he had returned to Auckland in 1853
- Born: April 1793; Grave, Dutch Republic
- Died: 8 July 1864 (aged 71); Auckland, New Zealand
- Resting place: Symonds Street Cemetery
- Known for: Attempt to establish his own sovereign state in New Zealand in the years before British annexation

Charles Philippe Hippolyte de Thierry (April 1793 – 8 July 1864) was a nineteenth-century adventurer who attempted to establish his own sovereign state in New Zealand in the years before the Treaty of Waitangi between the British Crown and the Māori chiefs in 1840.

== Biography ==
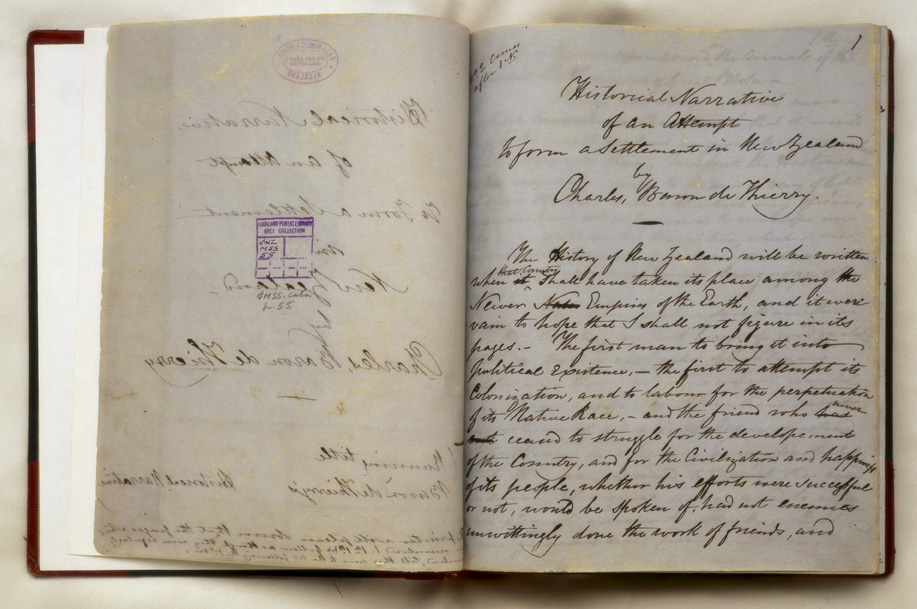
Page one of a manuscript entitled 'Historical narrative of an attempt to form a settlement in New Zealand' by Baron de Thierry.

De Thierry was from a French family that had fled to England following the revolution. He claimed to have been born in 1793 while his parents were fleeing, probably in Grave in the Netherlands. Upon reaching England, his father Charles Antoine de Thierry, claimed the title of Baron Nasher.

De Thierry was enrolled at Magdalen College, Oxford, and claimed to have transferred to a college of the University of Cambridge. There, he met Hongi Hika, the Ngāpuhi chief who was visiting England, and the missionary Thomas Kendall. De Thierry subsequently arranged a purchase of 40,000 acres (16,000 ha) at Hokianga, in Northland, through Kendall while at Cambridge. The land was bought for the price of 36 axes.

After travels in North America and the Caribbean, de Thierry came to the Pacific in 1835. In the Marquesas Islands, he announced himself King of Nuku Hiva and wrote to James Busby, the British Resident in New Zealand, of his intentions to land there and establish himself as "sovereign chief". His kingdom would embrace free trade and medicine, and share its "occasional bounties" with local chiefs. In Sydney 1837 he recruited some locals to join his adventure, but when he arrived in the Hokianga, rangatira (chiefs) Tāmati Wāka Nene and Eruera Maihi Patuone repudiated his claims. He was allowed to settle at a smaller, 800-acre plot by Nene and Te Taonui. The settlement was a failure, however, as de Thierry's followers rioted and abandoned him, and he was dependent on Māori charity. Despite his failures, he continued to exaggerate his successes to France and agitate for the establishment of a French colony led by himself. Any possibility of this was finally curtailed with the signing of the Treaty of Waitangi in 1840.

De Thierry subsequently moved to Auckland, where he worked as a piano teacher until his sudden death on 8 July 1864.
