= Thomas Kendall =

New Zealand missionary

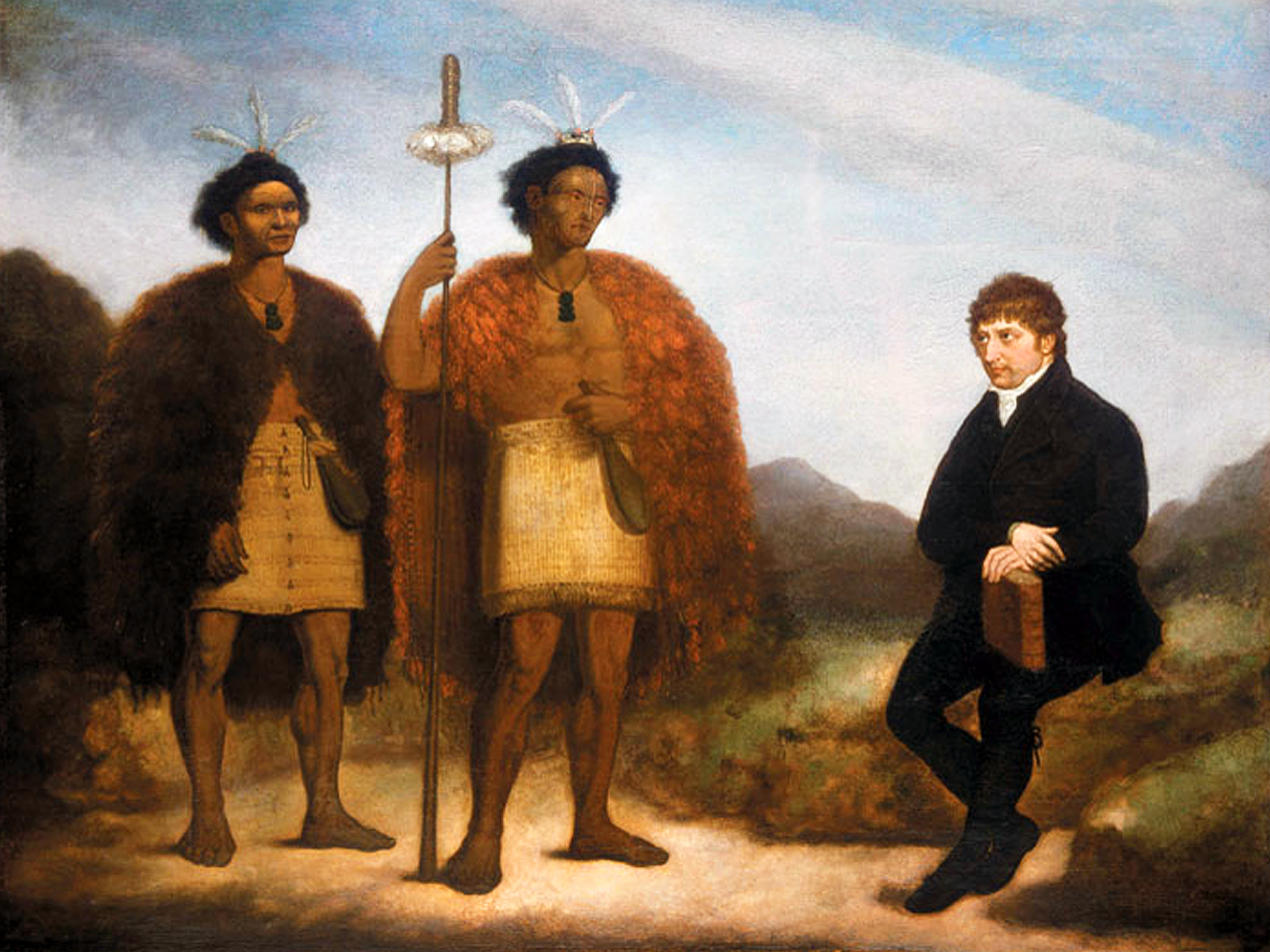
- From left, the chiefs Waikato and Hongi Hika with Kendall
- Born: 13 December 1778; North Thoresby, Lincolnshire, England
- Died: 6 August 1832 (aged 53); Off Sydney, New South Wales, when the cutter Brisbane sank with all hands
- Occupation: Missionary

Thomas Kendall (13 December 1778 – 6 August 1832) was a schoolmaster, an early missionary to Māori people in New Zealand, and a recorder of the Māori language. An evangelical Anglican, he and his family were in the first group of missionaries to New Zealand, accompanied to the Bay of Islands by Samuel Marsden in December 1814 and settling there. He wrote the first book in Māori, published in 1815. By 1821 he felt it necessary to accede to local Māori demands for guns in order to ensure their continued protection of the mission, and the Church Missionary Society dismissed him in 1822 for gun dealing. Marsden visited New Zealand to dismiss him in person in 1823, after learning that he had committed adultery with a Māori woman. Kendall left New Zealand in 1825 and died in a ship sinking in Australia in 1832.

== Early life: Lincolnshire and London, 1778–1813 ==
A younger son of farmer Edward Kendall and Susanna Surflit, Thomas Kendall was born in 1778. He grew up in North Thoresby, Lincolnshire, England, where he was influenced by his local minister Reverend William Myers and the evangelical revival within the Anglican Church. Dates of his early careers are disputed. While a teenager he moved with Myers to North Somercotes, where he was assistant schoolmaster and also helped run Myers's 15-acre (6.1 ha) farm. Kendall also tutored a gentleman's children in Immingham, where he met Jane Quickfall. On 21 November 1803, he married her and set up business as a draper and grocer. The business did not prosper.

In 1805, while attempting to sell a cargo of hops in London, Kendall visited Bentinck Chapel, Marylebone. Preaching of Basil Woodd and William Mann changed his outlook. He sold his business and moved his family to live in London, joining the congregation of that church and taking a job as a schoolmaster.

== Church Missionary Society ==
In 1808, he decided to become a missionary and applied to the Anglican Church Missionary Society to go to New Zealand. The society was a powerful organisation with a number of political connections, including the Colonial Secretary. It had recently adopted an experimental policy of sending lay preachers with practical skills to new missions, with the idea of bringing native peoples the benefits of English culture and religion – and the hope that men who could make their living from a trade might be welcomed by indigenous people where theologians were not.

More than 150 years previously, Dutch sailor Abel Tasman and his crew had become the first Europeans to sight New Zealand, and 40 years previously the coast had been mapped by Captain James Cook. However, extensive European contact with the Māori people had only begun in the previous decade. This was mostly by whalers operating out of shore bases; however, a few traders had formed a small settlement at Kororareka in the natural harbour of the Bay of Islands. This had gained a reputation for drunken lawlessness and corruption, with the sailors accused of encouraging prostitution and alcoholism among the Māori as well as kidnapping or press-ganging them. While there was some truth to this the sailors were in a poor position to present a threat to Māori, and lived largely by grace of these martial people. Nevertheless, as far as the Church Missionary Society was concerned, they were heathen souls to be converted.

A mission to New Zealand was promoted by Samuel Marsden, a Church Missionary Society agent in New South Wales, and in 1809 Kendall was chosen to join tradesmen William Hall and John King on a mission, with Kendall to work as a schoolmaster.

== Mission to New Zealand, 1813–1820 ==
After some delays and fundraising, Kendall and his family left for Sydney in May 1813. After further delays in Australia, Kendall and Hall took Marsden's vessel, the Active, and set out on 14 March 1814 on an exploratory journey to the Bay of Islands. They met rangatira (chiefs) such as Ruatara and the rising war leader of the Ngāpuhi, Hongi Hika, who had helped pioneer the introduction of the musket to Māori warfare. Hongi and Ruatara went with Kendall when he returned to Australia on 22 August.

The Governor of New South Wales, Lachlan Macquarie, gave permission for the foundation of the mission in November and appointed Kendall as a magistrate by an order dated 9 November 1814. His authority was stated to be: "that no Master of any Ship or Vessel belonging to Great Britain or any of her Colonies, shall land or discharge any Sailor or Sailors, or other Person, from on board his Ship or Vessel, within any of the Bays or Harbours of New Zealand, without having first obtained the Permission of the Chief or Chiefs of the Place, confirmed by the Certificate of the Resident Magistrate, in like manner as in the foregoing case." The governor also presumed to extend his own powers over New Zealand, issuing a proclamation that "natives are not to be carried off from New Zealand or the Bay of Islands by masters of vessels, or seamen or other persons without permission of chiefs, made in writing under hand of Revd Thomas Kendall, resident magistrate".

Kendall, Hall and King and their families, accompanied by Marsden, left Sydney in November 1814 and arrived in the Bay of Islands on 22 December. They established the mission there at Rangihoua. Kendall learned the Māori language, and wrote the primer A korao no New Zealand; or, the New Zealander's first book (1815), the first book written in Māori, which was published in Sydney. He started a school in August 1816 and it ran for over two years until it closed at the end of 1818 due to a lack of supplies. He sent off the manuscript of another book of Māori, but Samuel Lee, a linguist at the University of Cambridge, cast doubts on its accuracy. To defend his work Kendall decided to make an unauthorised trip to England.

== Trip to England, 1820–1821 ==
Kendall travelled to London in 1820, along with Hongi Hika and minor chief Waikato, on the whaling ship New Zealander. It is possible that Hongi wished to visit Britain and from his perspective Kendall was accompanying him. Although the Church Missionary Society disapproved of the trip, Hongi and Waikato were a social success. Kendall was ordained a priest on 12 November 1820 by the Bishop of Ely (though limited to New Zealand because of his lack of classical languages). Hongi and Kendall spent five months in Britain, mostly working with Lee in Cambridge, where Kendall's views about the language were justified (if some of his other theories were not; for example, Kendall believed the Māori were descended from Egyptians). Lee and Kendall's A grammar and vocabulary of the language of New Zealand was published in 1820.

Hongi was introduced to King George as the "King of New Zealand". He was shown over the Woolwich arsenal and given a suit of armour by the king, along with other gifts. At Cambridge Kendall and Hongi met the exiled French adventurer Charles de Thierry with whom Hongi did a land-for-muskets deal, purchasing 30,000 acres in the Bay of Islands. Kendall, Hongi, and Waikato travelled to New South Wales aboard the convict transport Speke. The 500 muskets, powder, ball, swords and daggers were uplifted from Port Jackson (Sydney) on their return voyage on Westmoreland (Captain Potton). In the following years, the guns helped him conquer a significant northern portion of the North Island in the Musket Wars and made him a man of considerable importance.

== Return to New Zealand, then dismissal from the Church Missionary Society ==
Kendall returned to New Zealand in July 1821. Kendall relied upon his friendship with Hongi Hika to assert leadership among other settlers, but it was a friendship bought in part by supporting the trade in firearms for Hongi's warriors, a trade Kendall himself profited by. The Church Missionary Society were understandably opposed, but Kendall felt they failed to understand the practicality of the situation, where the Anglican mission existed at Hongi's pleasure. On 27 September 1821 all the missionaries signed a letter written by Kendall defending the gun trade, saying he could not dictate what was sold to Māori: "They dictate to us! It is evident that ambition and self interest are amongst the principal causes of our security amongst them."

Around this time Kendall had begun an affair with Tungaroa, one of his school pupils who worked as a servant in his household. She was the daughter of a Rakau, a prominent Māori tohunga or priest and wise man. When the affair was discovered the pair eloped, living among nearby Māori. However, the relationship had ended by April 1822. His wife, Jane, took Kendall back, although he was unapologetic. One sailor wrote his rationalisation of the relationship with a Māori woman was "in order to obtain accurate information as to their religious opinions and tenets, which he would in no other way have obtained". Kendall indeed began a serious flirtation with Māori religious beliefs, an exploration he set out in a series of seven letters between 1822 and 1824. In 1822 he wrote that the "sublimity" of Māori spirituality saw him "almost completely turned from a Christian to a Heathen".

As a result of the letter of 27 September 1821 the Church Missionary Society dismissed Kendall in August 1822. Samuel Marsden, who also knew of Kendall's affair and his close relationship with Hongi, returned to New Zealand in August 1823 to sack him in person. When the Kendalls' ship, the Brampton, ran aground while leaving, Kendall decided to stay, claiming divine intervention. In a letter of 25 July 1824 to the Church Missionary Society, Kendall confessed his past "errors".

== Chile and Australia, 1825–1832 ==
The Kendall family remained living in the Bay of Islands until 1825, when he accepted a position as clergyman at the British consulate at Valparaíso, Chile. This job did not last, and his family settled in New South Wales, where he obtained a grant of 1,280 acres (5.2 km^{2}), including large stands of red cedar at Yackungarrah Creek, Yatte Yattah. His son Thomas Surfleet Kendall acquired the neighbouring farm. He bought the cutter Brisbane.

In the decade after Hongi Hika died and Kendall left in 1825, widescale conversion of Māori to Christianity occurred. Kendall attempted to continue his work on the Māori language in Australia, having drafted a substantially improved Māori grammar, but Marsden prevented its publication.

Thomas Kendall died in 1832 when the Brisbane sank with all hands off Cape St. George (some 200km south of Sydney) while bringing wood and cheese from his farm to market.

Family

- Suzannah (?1804–1881)
- Elizabeth Jane (?1805–1870)
- Thomas Surfleet (1807–1883)
- Basil (1809–1852)
- Joseph (1811–1865)
- John (1813–1813)
- Samuel (1816–1827)
- John (1818–1895)
- Lawrence (1819–1881)
- Edward (1822–1902)

One of his grandsons, Henry Kendall, was an Australian poet.

A biography is The Legacy of Guilt: a life of Thomas Kendall by Judith Binney.
