= Hongi Hika =

New Zealand Māori chief

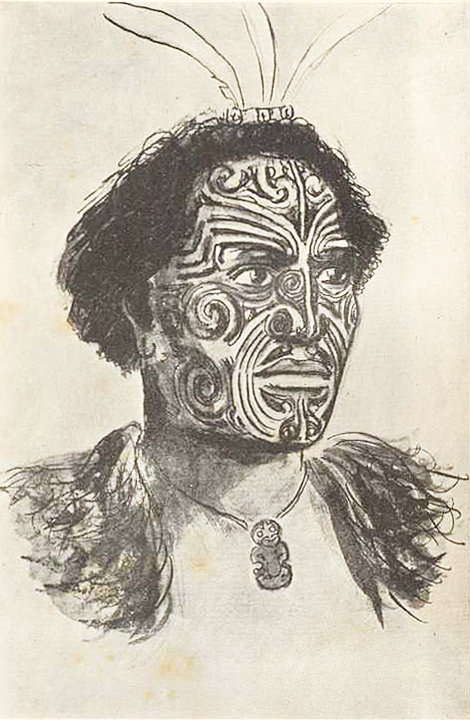
- Hongi Hika, a sketch of an 1820 painting
- Born: c. 1772; Kaikohe, New Zealand
- Died: 6 March 1828 (aged 55–56); Whangaroa, New Zealand
- Spouses: Turikatuku; Tangiwhare
- Military career
- Allegiance: Ngāpuhi
- Rank: Rangatira
- Conflicts: Musket Wars

Hongi Hika (c. 1772 – 6 March 1828) was a New Zealand Māori rangatira (chief) and war leader of the iwi of Ngāpuhi. He was a pivotal figure in the early years of regular European contact and settlement in New Zealand. As one of the first Māori leaders to understand the advantages of European muskets in warfare, he used them to overrun much of northern New Zealand in the early nineteenth century Musket Wars.

In order to obtain the muskets Hongi Hika encouraged Pākehā (European) settlement, built mutually beneficial relationships with New Zealand's first missionaries, introduced Māori to Western agriculture and helped put the Māori language into writing. He traveled to England and met King George IV. His military campaigns resulted in the Musket Wars, and preventing them was an important motivator for the British annexation of New Zealand and subsequent Treaty of Waitangi with Ngāpuhi and many other iwi.

== Early life and campaigns: 1772–1814 ==
Hongi Hika was born near Kaikohe into a powerful family of the Te Uri o Hua hapū (subtribe) of Ngāpuhi. His mother was Tuhikura, a Ngāti Rēhia woman. She was the second wife of his father Te Hōtete, son of Auha, who with his brother Whakaaria had expanded Ngāpuhi's territory from the Kaikohe area into the Bay of Islands area. Hongi said later in life that he had been born in the year explorer Marion du Fresne was killed by Māori (in 1772), and this is generally now accepted as his birth year, although some earlier sources place his birth around 1780.

Hongi Hika rose to prominence as a military leader in the Ngāpuhi campaign, led by Pokaia, the uncle of Hōne Heke, against the Te Roroa hapū of Ngāti Whātua iwi in 1806–1808. In over 150 years since the Māori first made sporadic contact with Europeans, firearms had not entered into widespread use. Ngāpuhi fought with small numbers of them in 1808, and Hongi was present later that same year on the first occasion that muskets were used in action by Māori. This was at the Battle of Moremonui at which Ngāpuhi were defeated; Ngāpuhi were overrun by the opposing Ngāti Whātua while reloading. Those killed included two of Hongi's brothers and Pokaia. Hongi and other survivors only escaped by hiding in a swamp until Ngāti Whātua called off the pursuit to avoid provoking utu.

After the death of Pokaia, Hongi became the war leader of the Ngāpuhi. His warriors included Te Ruki Kawiti, Mataroria, Moka Te Kainga-mataa, Rewa, Ruatara, Paraoa, Motiti, Hewa and Mahanga. In 1812 Hongi led a large taua (war party) to the Hokianga against Ngāti Pou. Despite the defeat of Ngāpuhi at Moremonui, he recognised the potential value of muskets in warfare if they were used tactically and by warriors with proper training.

== Contact with Europeans and journey to Australia: 1814–1819 ==
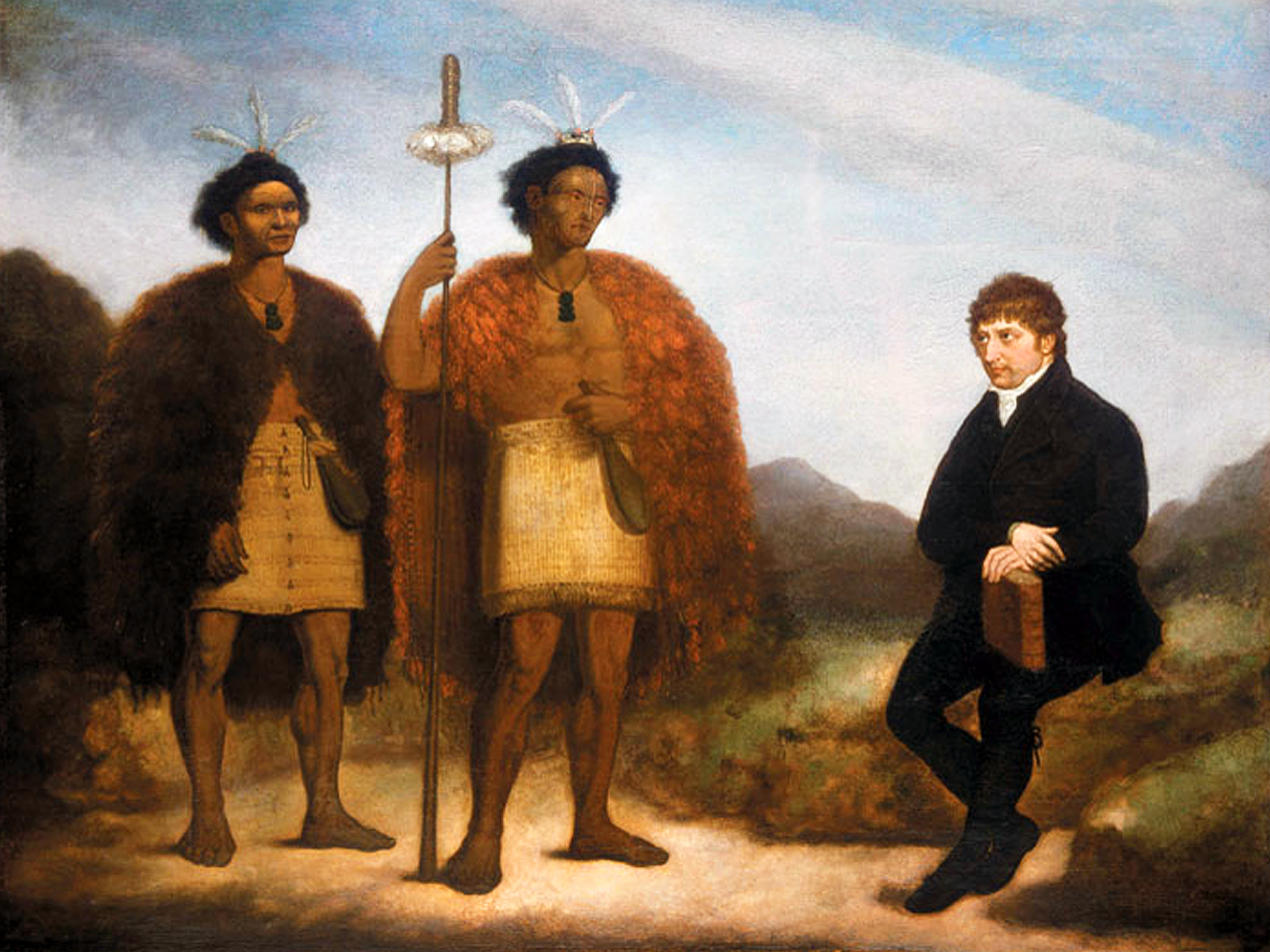
Chiefs Hongi Hika (centre) and Waikato meet with Kendall

Ngāpuhi controlled the Bay of Islands, the first point of contact for most Europeans visiting New Zealand in the early 19th century. Hongi Hika protected early missionaries and European seamen and settlers, arguing the benefits of trade. He befriended Thomas Kendall, one of three lay preachers sent by the Church Missionary Society to establish Christianity in New Zealand. Kendall wrote that when he first met Hongi in 1814, he already had 10 muskets of his own, and said that Hongi's handling "does him much credit, since he had no man to instruct him". Like other Europeans who met Hongi, Kendall recorded that he was struck by the gentleness of his manner, his charm and mild disposition. In written records, he was often referred to as "Shungee" or "Shunghi" by early European settlers.

Hongi's older half-brother, Kāingaroa, was an important chief, and his death in 1815 led to Hongi becoming the ariki of Ngāpuhi. Around this time Hongi married Turikatuku, who was an important military advisor for him, although she went blind early in their marriage. He later took her younger sister Tangiwhare as an additional wife. Both bore at least one son and daughter by him. Turikatuku was his favourite wife and he never travelled or fought without her. Early missionary visitors in 1814 witnessed her devotion to him.

In 1814 Hongi and his nephew Ruatara, himself a Ngāpuhi chief, visited Sydney with Kendall and met the local head of the Church Missionary Society Samuel Marsden. Marsden was later to describe Hongi as "a very fine character ... uncommonly mild in his manners and very polite". Ruatara and Hongi invited Marsden to establish the first Anglican mission to New Zealand in Ngāpuhi territory. Ruatara died the following year, leaving Hongi as protector of the mission at Rangihoua Bay. Other missions were also established under his protection at Kerikeri and Waimate North. While in Australia Hongi Hika studied European military and agricultural techniques and purchased muskets and ammunition.

As a result of Hongi's protection, ships came in increasing numbers, and his opportunities for trade increased. He was most keen to trade for muskets but the missionaries (particularly Marsden) were often unwilling to do so. This caused friction but he continued to protect them, on the basis that it was more important to maintain a safe harbour in the Bay of Islands, and in any event others visiting the islands were not so scrupulous. He was able to trade for iron agricultural implements to improve productivity and to grow crops, with the assistance of slave labour, that could be successfully bartered for muskets. In 1817, Hongi led a war party to Thames where he attacked the Ngāti Maru stronghold of Te Totara, killing 60 and taking 2,000 prisoners. In 1818 Hongi led one of two Ngāpuhi taua against East Cape and Bay of Plenty iwi Ngāti Porou and Ngaiterangi. Some fifty villages were destroyed and the taua returned in 1819 carrying nearly 2,000 captured slaves.

Hongi encouraged and assisted the first Christian missions to New Zealand, but never converted to Christianity himself. On 4 July 1819 he granted 13,000 acres of land at Kerikeri to the Church Missionary Society in return for 48 felling axes, land which became known as the Society's Plains. He personally assisted the missionaries in developing a written form of the Māori language. Hongi was not alone in seeing the relationship with the missionaries as one of trade and self-interest; indeed virtually no Māori converted to Christianity for a decade. Large scale conversion of northern Māori only occurred after his death. He protected Thomas Kendall when he left his wife, taking a Māori wife and participating in Māori religious ceremonies. In later life, exasperated with teachings of humility and non-violence, he described Christianity as a religion fit only for slaves.

== Journey to England and subsequent warfare: 1820–1825 ==
In 1820 Hongi Hika, his nephew Waikato, and Kendall travelled to England on board the whaling ship New Zealander. He spent five months in London and Cambridge where his facial moko tattoos made him something of a sensation. During the trip he met King George IV who presented him with a suit of armour. He was later to wear this in battle in New Zealand, causing terror amongst his opponents. In England he continued his linguistic work, assisting Professor Samuel Lee who was writing the first Māori–English dictionary, A Grammar and Vocabulary of the Language of New Zealand. Written Māori maintains a northern feel to this day as a result; for example, the sound usually pronounced "f" in Māori is written "wh" because of Hongi's soft aspirated northern dialect.

Hongi returned to the Bay of Islands on 4 July 1821. He travelled together with Waikato and Kendall, aboard the Speke which was transporting convicts to New South Wales and from there on the Westmoreland. He was reported to have exchanged many of the presents he received in England for muskets in New South Wales, to the dismay of the missionaries, and to have picked up several hundred muskets that were waiting for him. The muskets had been ordered by Baron Charles de Thierry whom Hongi met at Cambridge, England. De Theirry traded the muskets for land in the Hokianga, although De Theirry's claim to the land was later disputed. Hongi was able to uplift the guns without them being paid for. He also obtained a large quantity of gunpowder, ball ammunition, swords and daggers.

Using the weapons he had obtained in Australia, within months of his return Hongi led a force of around 2,000 warriors (of whom over 1,000 were armed with muskets) against those of the Ngāti Pāoa chief, Te Hinaki, at Mokoia and Mauinaina pā (Māori forts) on the Tamaki River. This battle resulted in the death of Hinaki and hundreds, if not thousands, of Ngāti Paoa men, women and children. This battle was in revenge for a previous defeat in around 1795, in which Ngāpuhi had sustained heavy losses. Deaths in this one action during the intertribal Musket Wars may have outnumbered all deaths in 25 years of the later New Zealand Wars. Hongi wore the suit of armour that had been gifted by King George IV during this battle; it saved his life, leading to rumours of his invincibility. Hongi and his warriors then moved down to attack the Ngāti Maru pā of Te Tōtara, which he had previously attacked in 1817. Hongi and his warriors pretended to be interested in a peace deal and then attacked that night while the Ngāti Maru guard was down. Hundreds were killed and a much larger number, as many as 2,000, were captured and taken back to the Bay of Islands as slaves. Again, this battle was in revenge for a previous defeat before the age of muskets, in 1793.

In early 1822 he led his force up the Waikato River where, after initial success, he was defeated by Te Wherowhero, before gaining another victory at Orongokoekoea. Te Wherowhero ambushed the Ngāpuhi carrying Ngāti Mahuta women captives and freed them. In 1823 he made peace with the Waikato iwi and invaded Te Arawa territory in Rotorua, having travelled up the Pongakawa River and carried their waka (each weighing between 10 and 25 tonnes) overland into Lake Rotoehu and Lake Rotoiti.

In 1824 Hongi Hika attacked Ngāti Whātua again, losing 70 men, including his eldest son Hāre Hongi, in the battle of Te Ika a Ranganui. According to some accounts Ngāti Whātua lost 1,000 men, although Hongi Hika himself, downplaying the tragedy, put the number at 100. In any event the defeat was a catastrophe for Ngāti Whātua; the survivors retreated south. They left behind the fertile region of Tāmaki Makaurau (the Auckland isthmus) with its vast natural harbours at Waitematā and Manukau; land which had belonged to Ngāti Whātua since they won it by conquest over a hundred years before. Hongi Hika left Tāmaki Makaurau almost uninhabited as a southern buffer zone. Fifteen years later when Lt. Governor William Hobson wished to remove his fledgling colonial administration from settler and Ngāpuhi influence in the Bay of Islands, he was able to purchase this land cheaply from Ngāti Whātua, to build Auckland, a settlement that has become New Zealand's principal city. In 1825 Hongi avenged the earlier defeat of Moremonui in the battle of Te Ika-a-Ranganui, although both sides suffered heavy losses.

== Final years and death: 1826–1828 ==
In 1826 Hongi Hika moved from Waimate to conquer Whangaroa and found a new settlement. In part this was to punish Ngāti Uru and Ngāti Pou for having harassed the European people at Wesleydale, the Wesleyan mission at Kaeo. On 10 January 1827 a party of his warriors, without his knowledge, ransacked Wesleydale and it was abandoned.

In January 1827, Hongi Hika was shot in the chest by the warrior Maratea during a minor engagement in the Hokianga. On his return to Whangaroa a few days later he found that his wife Turikatuku had died. Hongi lingered for 14 months, and at times it was thought that he might survive the injury; he continued to plan for the future by inviting missionaries to stay at Whangaroa, planning a Waikato expedition and schemed to capture the anchorage at Kororāreka (Russell). He invited those around him to listen to the wind whistle through his lungs and some claimed to have been able to see completely through him. He died of an infection on 6 March 1828 at Whangaroa. He was survived by five of his children, and his final burial place was a closely guarded secret.

Hongi Hika's death appears to be a turning point in Māori society. In contrast to the traditional conduct that followed the death of an important rangatira (chief), no attack was made by neighbouring tribes by way of muru (attack made in respect of the death) of Hongi Hika. There was an initial concern among the settlers under his protection that they might be attacked after his death, but nothing came of that. Furthermore, Wesleyan missionaries returned to the region, setting up Māngungu Mission near Horeke.

Frederick Edward Maning, a Pākehā Māori who lived at Hokianga from 1833, wrote a near contemporaneous account of Hongi Hika in A History of the War in the North of New Zealand Against the Chief Heke. His account said that Hongi warned on his deathbed that, if "red coat" soldiers should land in Aotearoa, "when you see them make war against them". James Stack, Wesleyan missionary at Whangaroa, recorded a conversation with Eruera Maihi Patuone on 12 March 1828, in which it was said that Hongi Hika exhorted his followers to oppose against any force that came against them and that his dying words were "No matter from what quarter your enemies come, let their number be ever so great, should they come there hungry for you, kia toa, kia toa – be brave, be brave! Thus will you revenge my death, and thus only do I wish to be revenged."

== Legacy ==
Hongi Hika is remembered as a warrior and leader during the Musket Wars. Some historians have attributed Hongi Hika's military success to his acquisition of muskets, comparing his military skills poorly with the other major Māori war leader of the period, Te Rauparaha, while others have said he should be given credit for being a talented general. In any event, he had the foresight and persistence to acquire European weapons and evolve the design of the Māori war pā and Māori warfare tactics; this evolution was a nasty surprise to British and colonial forces in later years during Hone Heke's Rebellion in 1845–46. Hongi Hika's campaigns caused social upheaval, but he also had influence through his encouragement of early European settlement, agricultural improvements and the development of a written version of the Māori language.

Hongi Hika's actions altered the balance of power not only in the Waitemata but also the Bay of Plenty, Tauranga, Coromandel, Rotorua and Waikato to an unprecedented extent, and caused significant redistribution of population. Other northern tribes armed themselves with muskets for self-defence and then used those to attack and overrun southern tribes. Although Hongi did not usually occupy conquered territory, his campaigns and those of other musket warriors triggered a series of migrations, claims and counter claims which in the late 20th century would complicate disputes over land sales in the Waitangi Tribunal, for example Ngāti Whātua's occupation of Bastion Point in 1977–78.

Hongi Hika never attempted to establish any form of long-term government over iwi he conquered and rarely attempted to permanently occupy territory. It is likely his aims were opportunistic, based on increasing his mana as a warrior. He is said to have stated during his visit to England, "There is only one king in England, there shall be only one king in New Zealand", but if he had ambitions of becoming a Māori king, they were never realised. In 1828 Māori lacked a national identity, seeing themselves as belonging to separate iwi. It would be 30 years before Waikato iwi recognised a Māori king. That king was Te Wherowhero, a man who had built his mana defending the Waikato against Hongi Hika in the 1820s.

His second son, Hāre Hongi Hika (having taken his older brother's name after the latter's death in 1825), was a signatory in 1835 to the Declaration of the Independence of New Zealand. He became a prominent leader after his father's death and was one of only six rangatira to sign the declaration by writing his name, rather than making a tohu (mark). He was later to be a prominient figure in Māori struggles for sovereignty in the nineteenth century and was instrumental in the opening of Te Tii Waitangi Marae in 1881. He died in 1885, aged in his seventies. Hongi Hika's daughter Hariata (Harriet) Rongo married Hōne Heke at the Kerikeri chapel on 30 March 1837. She had inherited her father's confidence and drive, and brought her own mana to the relationship. She had lived for some years with the family of Charlotte Kemp and her husband James Kemp.

Hongi Hika is portrayed leading a war party against the Te Arawa iwi in a 2018 music video for New Zealand thrash metal band Alien Weaponry's song "Kai Tangata".
