= 1826 in New Zealand =

- Decades: 1800s; 1810s; 1820s; 1830s; 1840s
- See also: History of New Zealand; List of years in New Zealand; Timeline of New Zealand history

The following lists events that happened during 1826 in New Zealand.

== Events ==
- 24 January - The first sailing ship built in New Zealand, the schooner Herald, is launched.
- 25 March - William Williams, missionary brother of Henry Williams, arrives in the Bay of Islands on the Brampton with his wife and daughter.
- 25 March – The 1825 New Zealand Company vessels Rosanna, Captain James Herd, and Lambton, Captain Barnett, arrive at Stewart Island and undergo refitting for a month.
- April or May
  - – Thomas Shepherd, agricultural superintendent with the New Zealand Company expedition, interviews James Caddell (see 1810). The location is unknown, possibly Ruapuke Island or Bluff or Otago Harbour (see next entry).
- May
  - – Thomas Shepherd explores the future site of Dunedin and produces the oldest surviving drawings of Otago Harbour and surrounding coasts including Waikouaiti.
  - – The Rosanna and the Lambton (see above) are the first European ships enter Wellington Harbour. Captain Herd names the harbour Port Nicholson after his friend John Nicholson, harbourmaster at Port Jackson (Sydney).
- 23 June - The Herald is the first European ship to enter Tauranga Harbour.
- 23 September – The New Zealand Company agents aboard the Rosanna complete the purchase of 'Pakatu' (Pakatoa), 'Taratora' (Rotoroa), 'Ponue' (Ponui) and 'Pake' (Pakihi) Islands in the Hauraki Gulf. They then become frightened of the local Māori, change their minds almost immediately, sell up and leave for the Bay of Islands.

Undated

- William Stewart establishes a timber, flax and trading settlement at Port Pegasus on Stewart Island.
- Sealers visit Cloudy Bay and set up stations in Port Underwood. Whalers visit later the same year.
- Jules Dumont d'Urville arrives in New Zealand on the Astrolabe during his circumnavigation. He charts much of New Zealand that Cook did not, in particular the Marlborough Sounds. (see also 1827).
- A European trading and shipbuilding enterprise is established at Horeke in the Hokianga.

== Births ==
- 10 December (in England): James Prendergast, judge.

Undated

- (in England): Josiah Firth, farmer and businessman.
- John Patterson, one of the first four Māori MPs

== See also ==
- List of years in New Zealand
- Timeline of New Zealand history
- History of New Zealand
- Military history of New Zealand
- Timeline of the New Zealand environment
- Timeline of New Zealand's links with Antarctica
