= 1815 in New Zealand =

- Decades: 1800s; 1810s; 1820s; 1830s
- See also: History of New Zealand; List of years in New Zealand; Timeline of New Zealand history

The first Christian mission is established at Rangihoua. The Hansen family, the first non-missionary family also settles there. Samuel Marsden explores the Hauraki Gulf and travels to within sight of Tauranga Harbour. The first book in Māori is published in Sydney. The first European is born in New Zealand.

Visits by sealing ships begin to decline; they are now sealing almost exclusively at the Macquarie and Campbell Islands and travel either via the east coast of New Zealand (calling at the Bay of Islands en route for refreshments) or via the southern fjords/Foveaux Strait/Stewart Island (stopping for refreshments in either/both directions).

== Incumbents ==
=== Regal and viceregal ===
- Head of State – King George III. With Prince George, Prince of Wales as prince regent.
- Governor of New South Wales – Lachlan Macquarie

== Events ==
- 9 or 13 January – Samuel Marsden, with a number of Māori including Te Morenga (as interpreter), Ruatara and Tui, leaves the Bay of Islands on the Active, commanded by Thomas Hansen Snr, to prospect the coast as far as Thames.
- 16 January – The Active anchors off Whakatiwai pā on the Firth of Thames coast. Marsden meets Ngāti Paoa chief Te Haupa.
- 17 January – The Active anchors off Orere Point.
- 19 January – Returning northward the Active calls into Whangārei, apparently only the second ever European vessel to do so, after the Venus in 1806.
- 20 January – At Pataua, just north of Whangārei, the passengers and crew of the Active meet Moehanga who had gone to England in 1805.
- 22 January – The Active returns to the Bay of Islands and anchors at Rangihoua Bay.
- 28 January – The Active anchors at the mouth of the Kawakawa river to collect timber.
- 15 February – The Active completes loading of flax and timber to take back to Port Jackson
- 21 February – Thomas Holloway King is the first European born in New Zealand. (see also 1816, 1817 & 1818)
- 24 February – Having completed the purchase of 200 acres for the mission site at Rangihoua, Marsden leaves for Port Jackson accompanied by chiefs Te Morenga and Te Pehi(Tupe).
- 3 March – Ngāpuhi chief Ruatara dies. His protection of the mission at Rangihoua passes to his uncle Hongi Hika. Ruatara's plans to trade in wheat (see 1814) die with him.
- 17 May – Te Morenga and Tupe return from Port Jackson on the Active.
- 25 December – Thomas Hansen Jnr marries Elizabeth Tollis in Sydney. (see also 1816 & 1817)

Undated

- Thomas Kendall has the first book printed in Māori, A korao no New Zealand; or, the New Zealander's first book; being an attempt to compose some lessons for the instruction of the natives, published in Sydney. (see also 1820)
- Sealers from the Governor Bligh under captain John Grono are the first Europeans to land in Canterbury at Banks Peninsula.
- William Tucker returns to Otago Harbour, possibly on the Governor Bligh, and takes up residence at Whareakeake where he lives with a Māori woman. (see also 1817)
- Te Rauparaha returns from his 5-year stay with Ngāti Maru in the Hauraki Gulf. During his stay he has received his first musket.
- Despite the incident of 1813 or 1814, when the Matilda under Captain Fowler returns to Otago Harbour in desperate need of fresh food and water, its crew are welcomed and assisted by local Māori without incident.
- The schooner The Brothers arrives in Port Jackson with a small cargo of Kauri gum, the first known export of minerals from New Zealand.

== Births ==
- 21 February: Thomas Holloway King, first European born in New Zealand.
- 12 March: George Lumsden, politician.
- 5 August (in England): Edward John Eyre, provincial governor.
- 25 August: John Williamson, politician.

undated

- Francis Jollie, politician.
- Horomona Pohio, Ngai Tahu leader.
- (in England): Robert Heaton Rhodes, politician.
- (in Bohemia): Anton Seuffert, cabinetmaker.

approximate

- Te Whiti o Rongomai, spiritual leader, pacifist.

== Deaths ==
- 3 March: Ruatara, Ngāpuhi chief

== See also ==
- History of New Zealand
- List of years in New Zealand
- Military history of New Zealand
- Timeline of New Zealand history
- Timeline of New Zealand's links with Antarctica
- Timeline of the New Zealand environment
