= Duder Regional Park =

Regional park in New Zealand

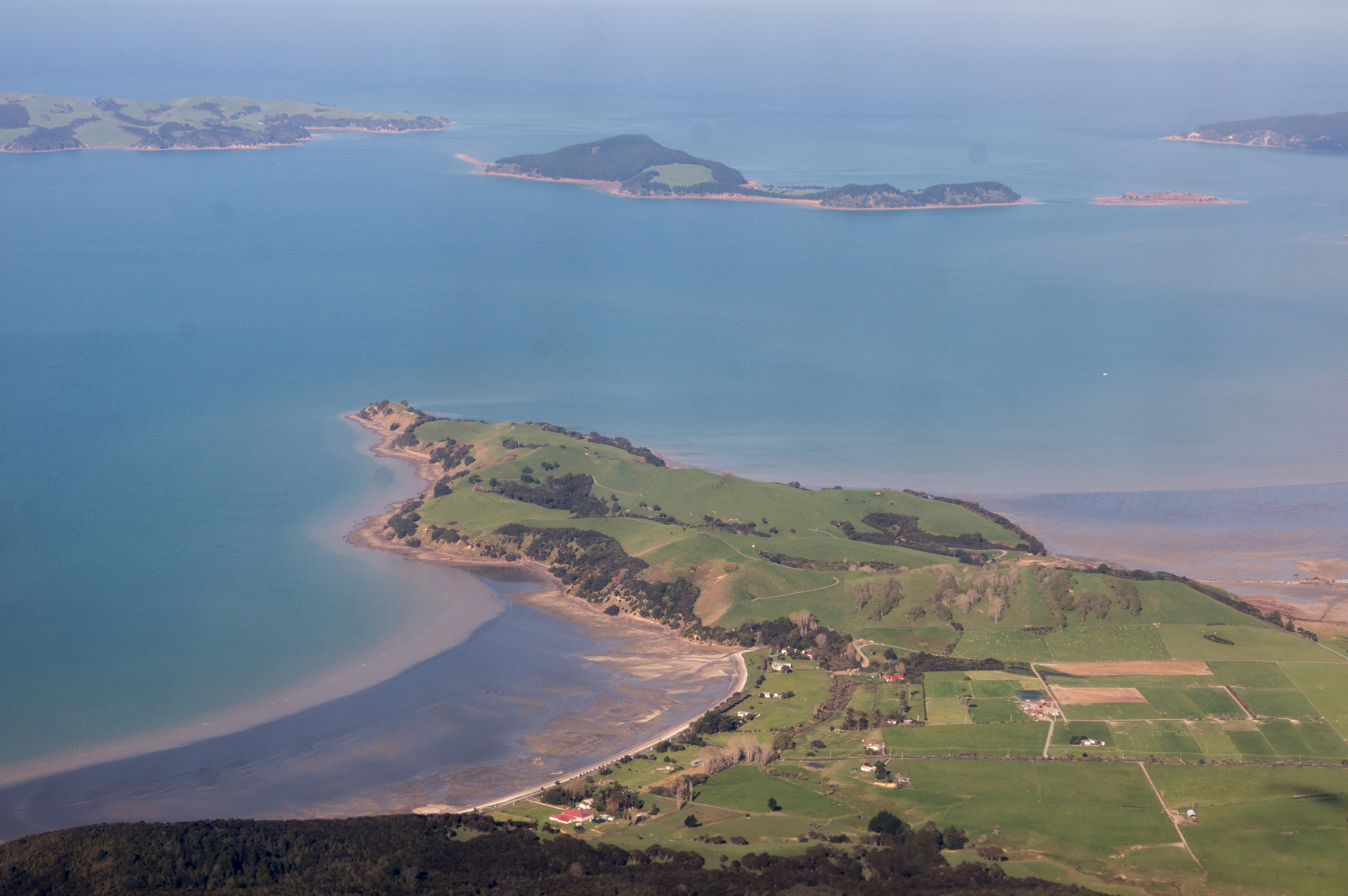
- Aerial view of the Whakakaiwhara Peninsula, with Ponui Island, Pakihi Island, and Karamuramu Island visible off the coast
- Interactive map of Duder Regional Park
- Type: Regional park
- Location: New Zealand
- Coordinates: 36.9061°S 175.0841°E
- Area: 165 hectares (410 acres)
- Created: 1995
- Operator: Auckland Council
- Open: Daylight saving: 6am-9pm Non-daylight saving: 6am-7pm Pedestrian access: 24 hours

Duder Regional Park (/ˈduːdər/ DUUD-ər) is a regional park situated on the coast to the east of Auckland, New Zealand, on the Whakakaiwhara Peninsula.

The area was one of the first places in the Auckland Region visited by the Tainui canoe, becoming an important settlement for Ngāi Tai ki Tāmaki. In the 1860s, the area was sold to the Duder family, who ran sheep on the peninsula until it was sold to the Auckland Regional Council and opened as a regional park in 1995.

== Geography ==
Duder Regional Park is located on the Whakakaiwhara Peninsula. The park is a 162 hectares (400 acres) working farm bounded to the west by Duders Beach. It is situated on a headland and offers commanding views of the Hauraki Gulf. There is limited native bush as most of the land is grassed, however the area to the southwest of the peninsula (called "the Big Bush") is a remnant of pre-human settlement forest. The southern coast is home to tidal mudflats and shell banks, which is a habitat for migratory birds.

Pōhutukawa trees line the coast of the peninsula. Small numbers of the endangered tuturiwhatu (New Zealand dotterel) breed on shell banks south of the park, which is not accessible to the public. Other birds found in the park are the pīwakawaka, kererū, ruru, tūī and riroriro.

== History ==
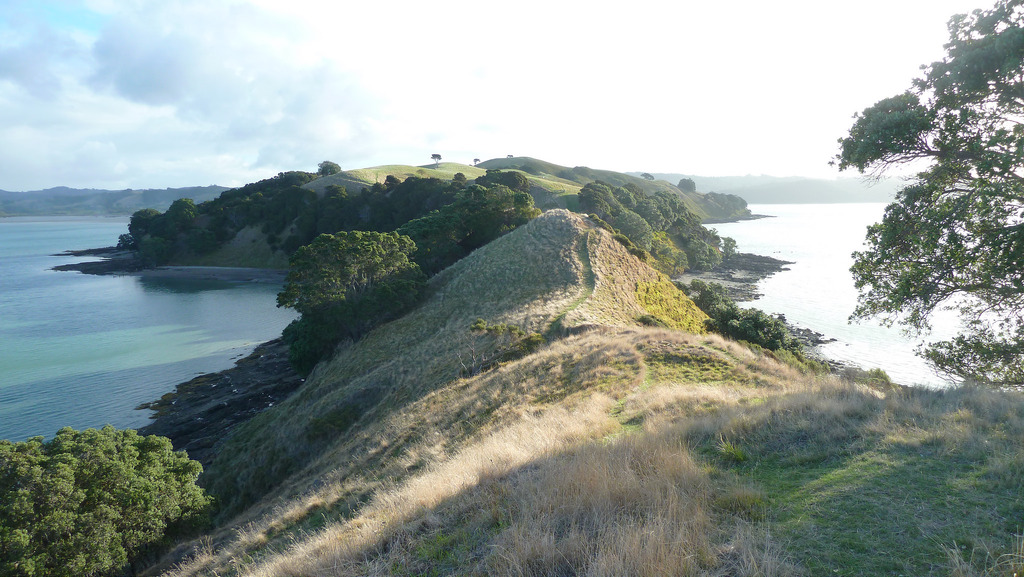
Whakakaiwhara Pā, located at the extreme east of the peninsula.

Prior to human settlement, the Whakakaiwhara Peninsula was heavily forested with Beilschmiedia tawa, Beilschmiedia tarairi (taraire), pūriri, karaka and kauri trees.

The peninsula was first visited by the Tainui ancestral canoe in the 1300s, where the waka took shelter from a storm while it was travelling northwards along the coast of the North Island. The peninsula's name, Whakakaiwhara, refers to the crew of the Tainui waka coming ashore to eat tāwhara, the edible flowers of the kiekie vine. During this visit, a crew member named Tāne Whakatia planted a karaka berry, which grew into Huna ā Tāne, a great kara tree which no longer exists, however is responsible for the many karaka trees on the peninsula. The location where the Tainui canoe moored is called Te Tauranga ō Tainui ("The Anchorage of Tainui"), located to the far east of the peninsula.

While the Tainui canoe left the area, crossing the Tāmaki River at Ōtāhuhu to reach the Manukau Harbour and later reaching the Kāwhia Harbour, not all those aboard settled at Kāwhia. Some members of Tainui remained in the area, becoming Ngāi Tai ki Tāmaki (originally known as Ngāti Tai). Ngāi Tai settled between the Whakakaiwhara Peninsula and the Wairoa River, building kāinga (villages) and pā (fortifications), and most of the peninsula was cleared for use as gardens. By the 1600s, Whakakaiwhara Pā and Te Oue Pā (to the south of the peninsula) were focal points of Ngāi Tai life, where the rangatira of the iwi were based. Hapū within Ngāi Tai moved around the rohe, settling in areas seasonally to harvest from the forest and beaches, fish, hunt sharks and farm. By the 1800s after European contact, the rangatira of Ngāi Tai were based at Umupuia (Duders Beach). During the 1820s, most members of Ngāi Tai fled to the Waikato due to the threats of the Musket Wars, however by the 1830s many had returned.

=== Early European settlement and the Duder family farm ===
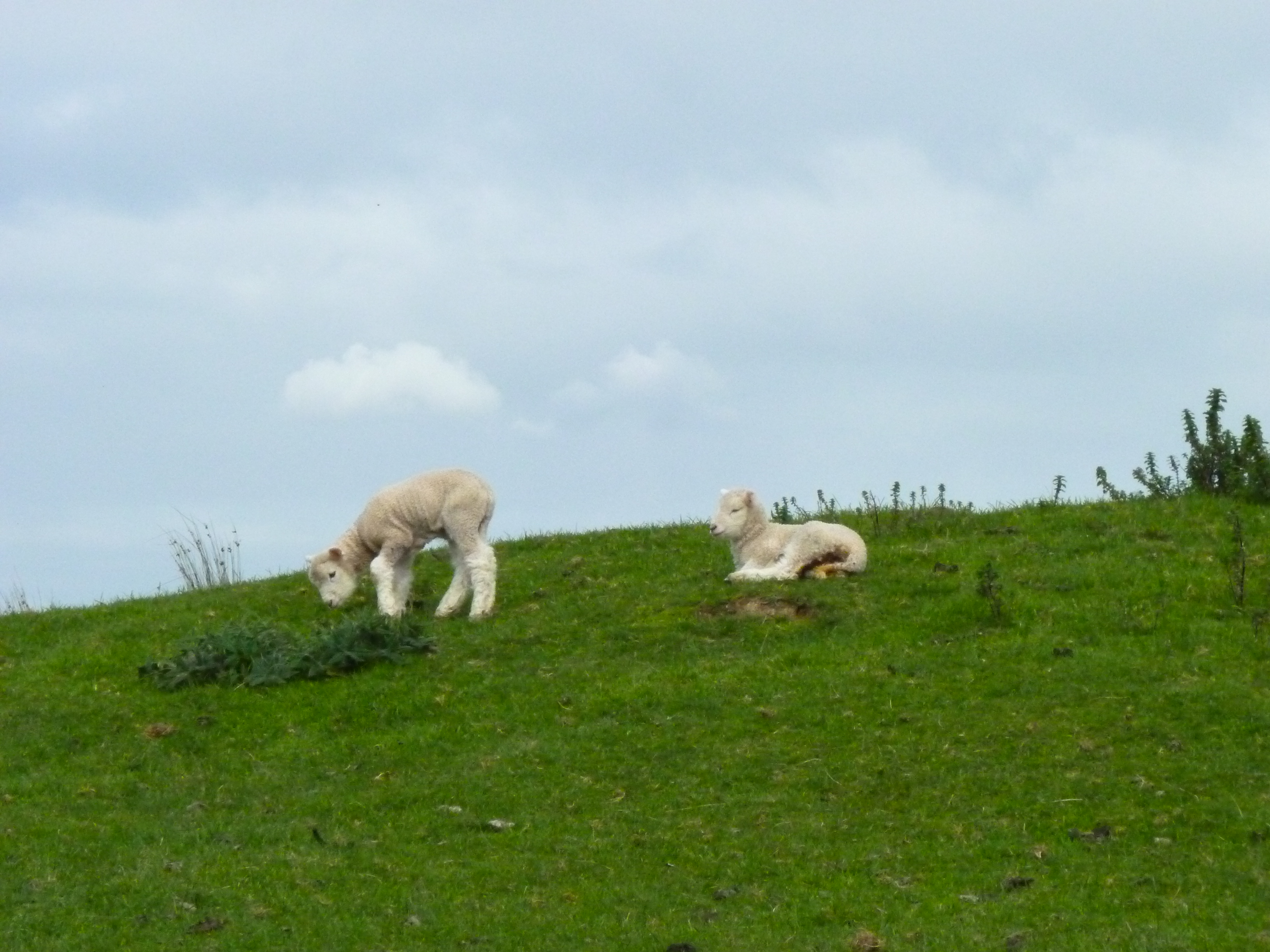
The Whakakaiwhara Peninsula has been used for sheep farming since the 1860s.

One of the earliest European settlers in the area was William Thomas Fairburn, who set up a Christian mission at Maraetai in the mid 1830s, however most European settlement of the area between Maraetai and the Wairoa River began in the 1850s. In 1854, the New Zealand government created a 6,063 acre native reserve for Ngāi Tai, including the Whakakaiwhara Peninsula. As a part of this arrangement, Ngāi Tai agreed not to settle elsewhere in the region, which meant that Ngāi Tai's tradition of settling in areas seasonally could not be continued. During the Invasion of the Waikato in the 1860s, rangatira Hori Te Whētuki kept a neutral position between the colonial government and the Kīngitanga Movement, however due to the shared Tainui connection between Ngāi Tai and the Kīngitanga Movement, many Ngāi Tai fought for the Kīngitanga. In the aftermath of the invasion, much of Ngāi Tai's rohe was confiscated, however the Whakakaiwhara Peninsula remained in Ngāi Tai possession.

When the Māori Land Court was established in 1865, the Ngāi Tai Native Reserve was subdivided into 10 blocks, owned by individuals instead of the iwi collectively. The iwi decided to sell most of these lands but remain at the Maratirai Block and Umupuia, to the west of the peninsula. In July 1866, rangatira Hori Te Whētuki sold the Whakakaiwhara Peninsula to Thomas Duder, a former boatswain who had emigrated to New Zealand in 1840 when his ship, HMS Buffalo, was shipwrecked. The Duder family developed the area with the help of local iwi as a sheep farm and orchard, however the peninsula, called "the Run" by the family, was mostly untouched and left as an unfenced grazing area for sheep. By the late 1800s, the farm was thriving due to refrigeration allowing sheep meat to be transported back to England. By the 1890s, 600 Romney-Merino and Merino-Corriedale sheep were farmed on the peninsula. The peninsula became a popular spot for local fishers, while nearby Umupuia Beach became a popular local spot for picnickers.

During World War I, the lowlands of the farm were converted for use as a dairy farm. In 1942, the Royal New Zealand Air Force selected the lower Whakakaiwhara Peninsula as a suitable space to construct an underground seaplane base. Construction was abandoned 18 months later. In 1944 until the end of World War II, the peninsula was used as a rocket range for training exercises. For the remainder of the 20th century, the farm remained in the hands of the Duder family, still primarily used for sheep farming, however from the 1930s onwards converted the peninsula into a productive farm, by clearing shrub, fencing the land and sowing pastures.

=== Regional park ===
The park was created in 1995 after the sale of the land by the Duder family to the Auckland Regional Council. An extra 13.7 hectares (34 acres) was added in 2010 to prevent coast development obstructing views from the park.

Annual visitors to the park increased from 42,000 in 2016 to 73,000 in 2021.

== Recreation ==
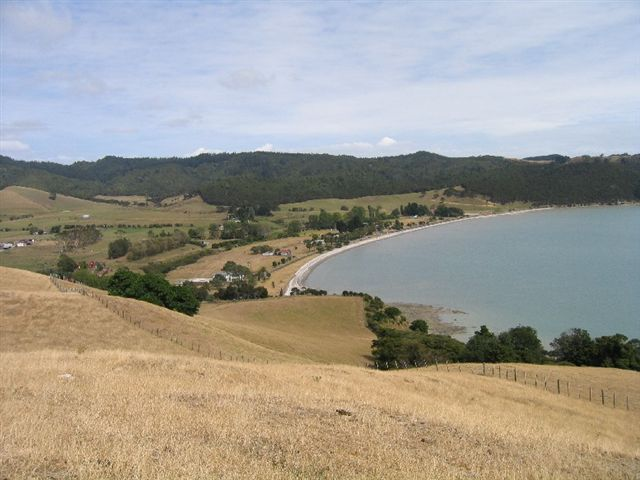
View from Duder Regional Park across Duders Beach.

The park has original native forest and birdlife, and views of surrounding hills, the Hunua Ranges and the Hauraki Gulf islands.

The beaches in the park have been used for swimming, picnicking and fishing since the late 19th century. Other activities include shell hunting, orienteering and mountain-biking.
