= 1825 in New Zealand =

- Decades: 1800s; 1810s; 1820s; 1830s; 1840s
- See also: History of New Zealand; List of years in New Zealand; Timeline of New Zealand history

The following lists events that happened during 1825 in New Zealand.

== Incumbents ==
=== Regal and viceregal ===
- Head of State – King George IV
- Governor of New South Wales – Major-General Sir Thomas Brisbane, although recalled on 29 December 1824 only leaves in December this year. His successor, General Ralph Darling appointed in 1824 finally arrives in New South Wales on 25 December.

== Events ==
- Ngāpuhi chief Hongi Hika's campaign against Ngāti Whātua ends with the battle Te Ika a Ranganui on the Kaiwaka River (approximately 105 km north of modern downtown Auckland). Hongi's eldest son is killed in the battle. Most of the Ngāti Whatua survivors, heavily defeated, flee south, leaving Tāmaki-makau-rau (Auckland) almost deserted until the arrival of Governor William Hobson in 1840. Hongi later pursues the Ngāti Whatua survivors into the Waikato.

Undated

- The 1825 New Zealand Company forms. A preliminary expedition to New Zealand, with 60 artisans, leaves Great Britain on the Rosanna (Captain James Herd) and the Lambton (Captain Barnett) before the end of the year.
- Wesleyan missionary William White becomes possibly the first European to visit the central Waikato.

== Births ==
- 10 February (in England): William Reeves, Journalist and politician.
- 13 March (in England): Benjamin Mountfort, architect.
- 28 July (in England): Maxwell Bury, architect.
- 13 August (in England): William Gisborne, colonial secretary.
- 18 December (in England): William Sefton Moorhouse, politician.

Undated

- (in Ireland): George Boyd, potter.

== See also ==
- List of years in New Zealand
- Timeline of New Zealand history
- History of New Zealand
- Military history of New Zealand
- Timeline of the New Zealand environment
- Timeline of New Zealand's links with Antarctica
