= Frenchmans Cap (disambiguation) =

Frenchmans Cap is a mountain in the West Coast region of Tasmania, Australia.

Frenchmans Cap may also refer to:

- Kahakaha / Frenchmans Cap, an island east of Waiheke Island, New Zealand
- Kotanui Island / Frenchmans Cap, an island near Whangaparāoa Peninsula, New Zealand

== See also ==
- Bonnet rouge, a type of Phrygian cap which became a symbol in the French Revolution
- Beret, a type of hat commonly associated with France
