= Kahakaha / Frenchmans Cap =

Island in New Zealand

Māori: Kahakaha
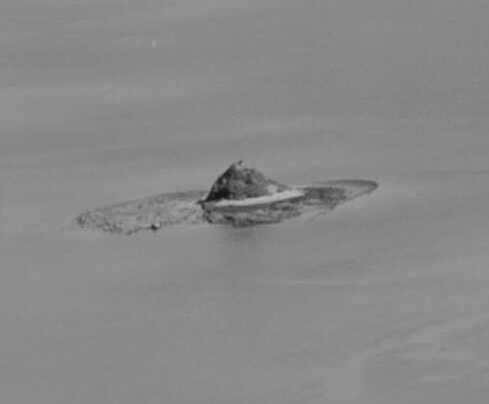
- Interactive map of Kahakaha / Frenchmans Cap

Geography
- Location: Auckland Region
- Coordinates: 36.80348°S 175.18481°E
- Area: 0.98 ha (2.4 acres)
- Length: 0.037 km (0.023 mi)
- Width: 0.023 km (0.0143 mi)
- Highest elevation: 20 m (70 ft)

Administration
- New Zealand

Demographics
- Population: 0

Frenchmans Cap, also known as Kahakaha, is a high rock stack island located in the Hauraki Gulf of New Zealand, off the eastern coast of Waiheke Island.

== Geography ==
The island is located in the inner Hauraki Gulf, between eastern Waiheke Island, Pakatoa Island and Rotoroa Island, due east of Taniwhanui Point. The island is small and steep, reaching a height of 20 m (66 ft). It is composed of Waipapa Terrane greywacke, red chert and argillite. The island has a shallow cave to the northeast. The closest island is Pakatoa Island, located 850 m (2,790 ft) away.

== Etymology ==
The island's English language name refers to the conical shape of the island, resembling a bonnet rouge. The etymology of the Māori language name is uncertain.

== Biodiversity ==
Much of the island is dominated by coastal forest and exotic grasses, with some native plants including Pseudopanax lessonii, Pittosporum crassifolium, Metrosideros excelsa and Coprosma repens. The herb Wahlenbergia vernicosa, at risk of decline, can also be found on the island. The island is a nesting area for smaller seabirds, including the New Zealand dotterel, variable oystercatcher, the black-backed gull, Caspian tern and the white-fronted tern.

== History ==
The island was purchased in 1845 by Charles Mcintosh in a private transaction with members of Ngāi Tai ki Tāmaki and Ngāti Pāoa, along with neighbouring Rotoroa Island. In 1849, the Crown Grants Commission failed to confirm this sale, and designated the island to be surplus land, becoming Crown land.

Since 1993, the Department of Conservation has maintained rat traps on the island, having only caught one rat between 1993 and 2024. The island is currently administered by the Auckland Council, classified as a marine Significant Ecological Area.
