= 1828 in New Zealand =

- Decades: 1800s; 1810s; 1820s; 1830s; 1840s
- See also: History of New Zealand; List of years in New Zealand; Timeline of New Zealand history

The following lists events that happened during 1828 in New Zealand.

== Incumbents ==
=== Regal and viceregal ===
- Head of State – King George IV
- Governor of New South Wales – General Ralph Darling

== Events ==
- 3, 6 or 7 March - Ngāpuhi rangatira (chief) and war leader Hongi Hika dies at Whangaroa.
- 4 May - The 40-ton schooner Enterprise, the second sailing ship built in New Zealand, is wrecked in a storm north of the Hokianga, with the loss of all hands.
- 6 May - The 55-ton schooner Herald, the first sailing ship built in New Zealand, is wreaked on the Hokianga bar, with no loss of life.

Undated

- John Guard establishes a subsidiary whaling station at Kakapo Bay in Port Underwood. (see 1827)
- Phillip Tapsell sets up a flax trading post at Maketu.
- Whalers Dicky Barrett, Jacky Love and others establish a trading post at Ngamotu Beach, the first Europeans to settle in the New Plymouth area.

== Births ==
- 15 February (in Prussia): Gustavus von Tempsky, adventurer, soldier and painter.
- 23 March (in Scotland): Charles O'Neill, politician and philanthropist.

Undated

- Thomas Gillies, politician.

Approximate

- Tohu Kākahi, Māori prophet and pacifist leader.

== Deaths ==
- 3, 6 or 7 March (see above) Hongi Hika, New Zealand Chief (born 1772)

Undated

- Te Whareumu, Ngati Manu chief.

== See also ==
- List of years in New Zealand
- Timeline of New Zealand history
- History of New Zealand
- Military history of New Zealand
- Timeline of the New Zealand environment
- Timeline of New Zealand's links with Antarctica
