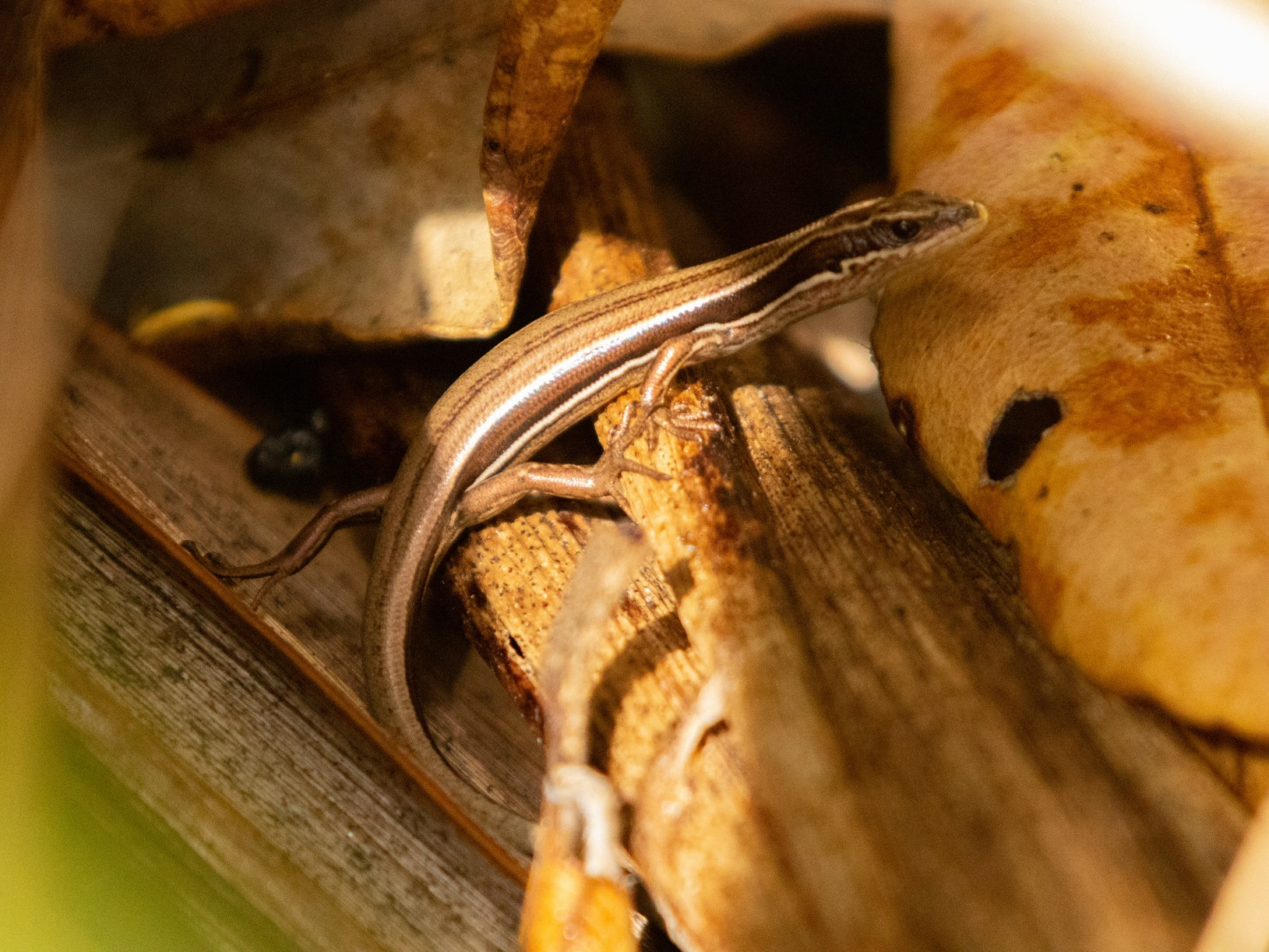

Scientific classification
- Kingdom: Animalia
- Phylum: Chordata
- Class: Reptilia
- Order: Squamata
- Family: Scincidae
- Genus: Oligosoma
- Species: O. moco

Binomial name
- Oligosoma moco (Duméril & Bibron, 1839)
- Distribution of the moko skink in the North Island Known native range

Synonyms
- Leiolopisma moco; Lygosoma moco Duméril & Bibron, 1839; Lygosomella moco; Mocoa owenii Gray, 1845

= Moko skink =

Species of lizard

The moko skink (Oligosoma moco) is a species of lizard in the family Scincidae (skinks) that is endemic to New Zealand.

== Taxonomy ==
The species was first described by André Marie Constant Duméril and Gabriel Bibron in 1839 under the name Lygosoma moco. In 1955 when Charles McCann revised the taxa of New Zealand skinks, he placed the species within the genus Leiolopisma, which made the species' scientific name Leiolopisma moco for much of the 20th century. This was until 1995 when Geoff Patterson and Charles Daugherty reinstated the genus Oligosoma for New Zealand skinks, leading to the species' modern name Oligosoma moco. The specific epithet moco refers to moko, the Māori word for lizards in general.

== Description ==
The colour and patterns are variable, but the overall colour is coppery or olive brown and it usually has an even edged dark brown stripe along the side, bordered cream or white on the top and bottom. Some individuals are very dark. It has distinctive long toes and tail, and grows to a maximum snout–vent length of 81 mm (3.2 in). The very long tail can make up over half the total body length.

The species can be distinguished from the undescribed Whirinaki skink (also a member of Oligosoma) due to the Whirinaki skinks having a distinct teardrop marking below their eyes.

== Distribution ==
It is endemic to New Zealand and is found throughout the northeastern part of the North Island, between North Cape and the Bay of Plenty, as well as numerous islands off the east coast of the North Island, where it is most commonly found. To help protect the species, skinks were released into the Rotoroa Island sanctuary in 2015.

== Ecology ==
Moko skinks are generally found in coastal environments. They are active mainly by day and are often seen basking on warm rocks. They are also found under logs and stones and in clay banks. They eat small insects, spiders and similar invertebrates. They often emerge from vegetation edges to hunt on beaches and open rocky areas.

== Reproduction ==
Like most of the New Zealand native skinks, the moko skink gives birth to live young, rather than laying eggs. Litters of between two and six are born between February and March.
