= 1817 in New Zealand =

- Decades: 1800s; 1810s; 1820s; 1830s
- See also: History of New Zealand; List of years in New Zealand; Timeline of New Zealand history

The following lists events that happened during 1817 in New Zealand.

== Incumbents ==
=== Regal and viceregal ===
- Head of State – King George III. With Prince George, Prince of Wales as prince regent.
- Governor of New South Wales – Lachlan Macquarie

== Events ==
- 11 January – Hannah King Hansen (later Letheridge, then Clapham) is born at Oihi, Rangihoua Bay. She is the second female European child born in New Zealand. Her gravestone at Christ Church in Russell claims she was the first female child, and she is certainly the first female child to attain her majority and whose subsequent history is known. (see 1815)
- January – Hongi Hika leads 800 Ngāpuhi in a fleet of 30 canoes to make peace with the North Cape tribes. He quarrels with tribes at Whangaroa on the way and immediately returns to the Bay of Islands in case they attack the Rangihoua mission in his absence.
- 11 December – William Tucker (see 1815) returns to Otago Harbour from Hobart on the Sophia, Captain Kelly, with other intending settlers. They later land at Whareakeake but Tucker and 2 others are killed and eaten, probably as part of the War of the Shirt (see 1810). In retaliation Kelly fires on the Māori, killing as many as 70, and destroys the kāinga (village) at nearby Otakou. The beach is subsequently given the name Murdering Beach.

Undated

- Brothers-in-law Charles Gordon and William Carlisle and their wives arrive to bolster the CMS mission at Rangihoua.
- The school at Rangihoua has a roll of 70, half boys, half girls, ranging in age from 7 to 17.

== Births ==
- 7 January (in England):Charles Flinders Hursthouse, author and settler.
- 31 March (in England): George Lyttelton, 4th Baron Lyttelton, British politician, co-founder of Canterbury.
- 12 May (in England): Isaac Luck, architect.
- 3 November (in Scotland): Logan Campbell, father of Auckland.

Undated

- Theodore Haultain, politician.
- (in Scotland): David Lyall, Botanist.
- Theophilus Daniel, politician (died 1893).

== Deaths ==
December: William Tucker, early settler in Otago.

== See also ==
- History of New Zealand
- List of years in New Zealand
- Military history of New Zealand
- Timeline of New Zealand history
- Timeline of New Zealand's links with Antarctica
- Timeline of the New Zealand environment
