= 1818 in New Zealand =

- Decades: 1800s; 1810s; 1820s; 1830s
- See also: History of New Zealand; List of years in New Zealand; Timeline of New Zealand history

The following lists events that happened during 1818 in New Zealand.

== Incumbents ==
=== Regal and viceregal ===
- Head of State – King George III. With Prince George, Prince of Wales as prince regent.
- Governor of New South Wales – Lachlan Macquarie

== Events ==
- January (early) – Te Morenga leads 400 against Ngāiterangi and Ngāti Porou. They destroy the Matarehu pā on Mōtītī Island but the Ngāiterangi chief, Te Waru, is absent. They proceed to East Cape and campaign for several months against Ngāti Porou.
- 7 February – Hongi Hika leads a second Ngā Puhi campaign against Ngāti Porou. They ravage many villages in the Bay of Plenty before passing East Cape and attacking Ngāti Porou in Hicks Bay.
- November – Te Morenga returns to the Bay of Islands.
- 12 November – Thomas Holloway King, the first European born in New Zealand, dies, and is buried at Rangihoua.

Undated

- Thomas Kendall's school at Rangihoua closes.
- Kendall sends a manuscript spelling book of Māori to the Church Missionary Society but Professor Lee raises some doubts over it. (see 1820)

== Births ==
- 28 July (in England): Thomas Mason, horticulturist and politician.

undated

- (in England): James FitzGerald, politician.
- Frederick Merriman, politician.

== See also ==
- History of New Zealand
- List of years in New Zealand
- Military history of New Zealand
- Timeline of New Zealand history
- Timeline of New Zealand's links with Antarctica
- Timeline of the New Zealand environment
