= 1823 in New Zealand =

- Decades: 1800s; 1810s; 1820s; 1830s; 1840s
- See also: History of New Zealand; List of years in New Zealand; Timeline of New Zealand history

The following lists events that happened during 1823 in New Zealand.

== Incumbents ==
=== Regal and viceregal ===
- Head of State – King George IV
- Governor of New South Wales – Major-General Sir Thomas Brisbane

== Events ==
- 7 May – John Kent arrives in Foveaux Strait to investigate the possibility of setting up a flax trade.
- 16 May – William White and others arrive in the St Michael to reinforce the Wesleyan missionaries in the Bay of Islands.
- 6 June – Samuel Leigh and William White establish the first Wesleyan mission at Kaeo, near Whangaroa, which they call 'Wesleydale' (var. Wesley-Dale).
- 17 July – John Kent on the naval cutter Mermaid visits Otago Harbour and, not knowing it has already been named, calls it Port Oxley.
- 23 June – Phillip Tapsell is married for the first time, to Maria Ringa of Ngā Puhi, by Thomas Kendall. The bride runs away later the same day. This is probably the first Christian wedding in New Zealand (as later claimed by Tapsell himself).
- 3 August – The Brampton arrives at the Bay of Islands. On board are Samuel Marsden, Henry Williams and family, and the Wesleyan missionaries John Hobbs and Nathaniel Turner (and family).
- 9 August – Reverend Marsden, in person, delivers the letter sacking Thomas Kendall from the Church Missionary Society. (see 1822)
- 19 August – After the arrival of John Hobbs and Nathaniel Turner, Samuel Leigh leaves the Kaeo mission.
- 7 September – The Brampton runs aground on leaving the Bay of Islands. On board are Samuel Marsden, Thomas Kendall and Samuel Leigh.
- 14 September – Samuel Marsden and Samuel Leigh resume their departure from New Zealand. Thomas Kendall changes his mind and stays.
- November
  - – John Gare Butler, the original owner of Kemp House, leaves the Kerikeri mission.

Undated

- The Sealers' War, also known as 'The War of the Shirt', in the Otago region, finally comes to an end (before July). (see also 1810)
- Reverend Marsden starts the third Church Missionary Society mission at Paihia with Henry Williams in charge.
- The first church in New Zealand is built at Paihia. The original, made of raupo, is not replaced until 1855.
- John Kent on HMS Elizabeth Henrietta is the first identified European visitor to the Taranaki. Traders and/or whalers had recently visited the area. Others who visited this year include the barque William Stoveld which is reported to have traded at the Waitara river mouth, and John Guard in the Waterloo.
- Hongi Hika leads Ngāpuhi in an attack on Te Arawa at Mokoia Island.

== Births ==
- 27 February: (in Scotland) James Hume, medical doctor.
- 9 May (in England): Frederick Weld, 6th Premier of New Zealand.
- 29 June (in Australia): George Clarke, educationalist.
- 13 August (in Scotland): Thomas Dick, merchant and politician.
- 17 November (in Tasmania): William Clayton, architect.

Undated

- Dingley Askham Brittin, politician.

== See also ==
- History of New Zealand
- List of years in New Zealand
- Military history of New Zealand
- Timeline of New Zealand history
- Timeline of New Zealand's links with Antarctica
- Timeline of the New Zealand environment
