= Ponui donkey =

New Zealand breed of donkey

Ponui
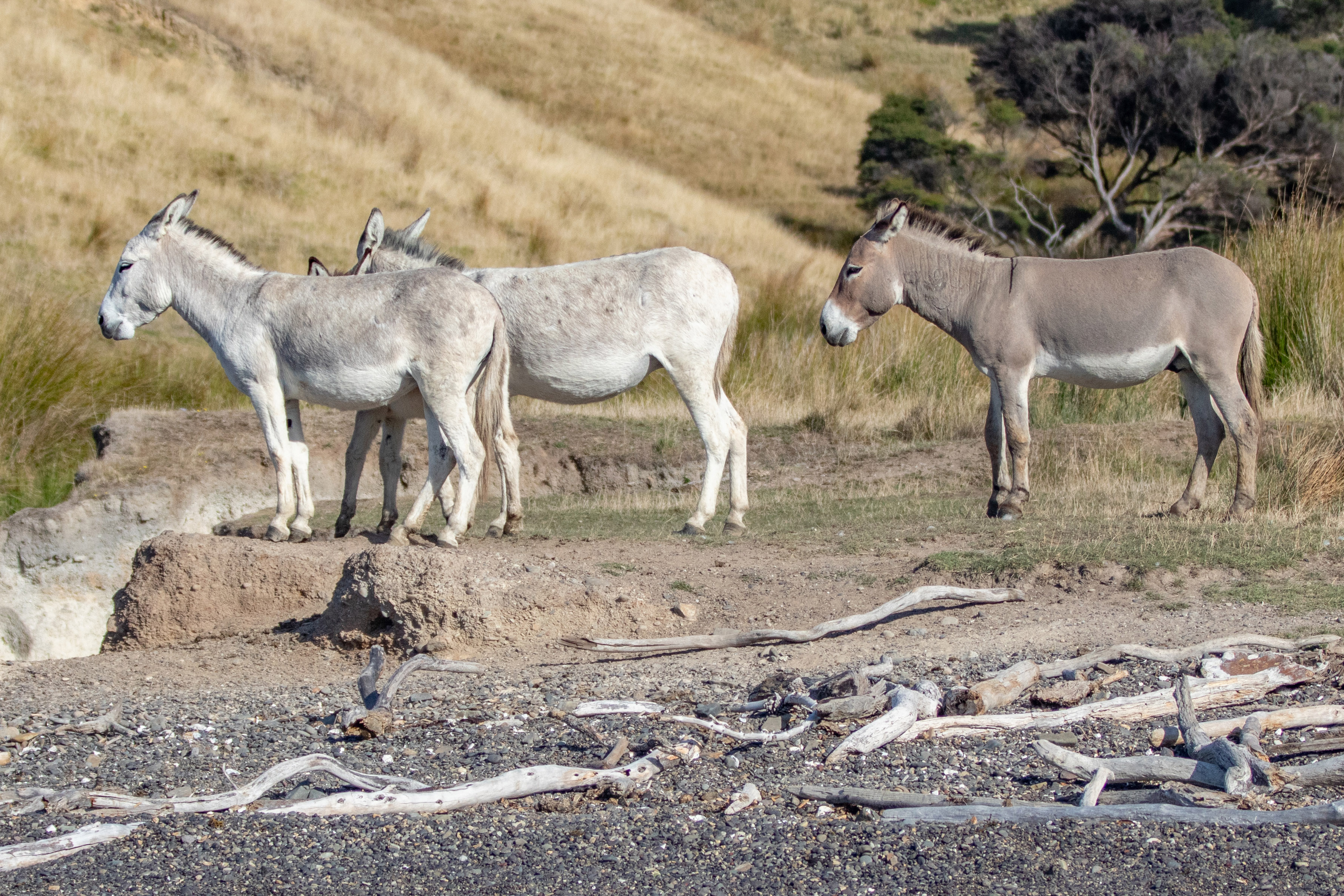
- Donkeys on Ponui Island
- Conservation status: FAO (2007): not listed; Rare Breeds Conservation Society: rare
- Other names: Ponui Island Donkey; New Zealand Donkey
- Country of origin: New Zealand
- Distribution: New Zealand
- Standard: Donkey & Mule Society of New Zealand

Traits
- Height: 91–107 cm (36–42 in)
- Coat: light dun or chocolate, with darker dorsal stripe

The Ponui or Ponui Island Donkey is a breed and feral population of domestic donkey from Ponui Island, in the Hauraki Gulf off New Zealand. It is the only feral donkey in New Zealand. It may also be called the New Zealand Donkey.

== History ==
Frederick Chamberlin bought Ponui Island from the New Zealand government in 1854. Donkeys were brought to the island together with other livestock from New South Wales, and a feral population established itself. The Ponui Island Donkey now has formal breed status, and some are distributed in mainland New Zealand. It is registered by the Donkey & Mule Society of New Zealand. The Ponui is listed as 'rare' by the Rare Breeds Conservation Society of New Zealand; it is not among the New Zealand livestock breeds reported to the DAD-IS database of the Food and Agriculture Organization of the United Nations.

== Characteristics ==
The Ponui donkey is docile and sturdy. It stands about 1 metre at the withers. It is usually light dun in colour, but may be chocolate; broken-coloured donkeys cannot be registered.

== See also ==
- Feral donkeys in Australia
- Kaimanawa horse
