= 1819 in New Zealand =

- Decades: 1800s; 1810s; 1820s; 1830s
- See also: History of New Zealand; List of years in New Zealand; Timeline of New Zealand history

The following lists events that happened during 1819 in New Zealand.

== Incumbents ==
=== Regal and viceregal ===
- Head of State – King George III. With Prince George, Prince of Wales as prince regent.
- Governor of New South Wales – Lachlan Macquarie

== Events ==
- January – Hongi Hika returns from his expedition to East Cape and the Bay of Plenty (see 1818) with 2000 prisoners.
- 5 May – Samuel Leigh arrives on the Active to recuperate from ill-health at Samuel Marsden's invitation.
- 17 June – Leigh returns to New South Wales. While in New Zealand he has conceived the idea of establishing a Wesleyan mission to the Māori. He returns to England before the end of the year with this proposition in mind. His report to Marsden leads to the appointment of John Gare Butler to head the second Church Missionary Society mission.
- 24 July – Governor Macquarie appoints Butler a justice of the peace for New Zealand.
- 12 August – Marsden arrives in New Zealand on the General Gates on his second visit accompanied by Butler and James Kemp and their families. Marsden accepts the offer of land at Kerikeri from Hongi Hika to start the second Church Missionary Society mission. Butler will be in charge. He is the first resident ordained clergyman in New Zealand.
- 25 September – Marsden plants the first grape vines in New Zealand.
- 9 November – Marsden leaves at the end of his second visit.
- 20 or 21 December – The Butlers and Kemps take up residence in Kerikeri.

Undated

- Te Rauparaha joins a Ngāpuhi attack on Ngāti Maru in Taranaki. The Ngāpuhi have enough muskets to soon win several battles (the Ngāti Maru have never seen muskets before) and capture a number of pa before continuing on to Cook Strait. When they pass through Kawhia on their return the Ngāpuhi give the Ngāti Toa some muskets. Later in the year Ngāti Toa (possibly led by Te Rauparaha) return to the Cook Strait region looking for a new place to settle as they are under severe pressure from Waikato and Ngāti Maniapoto at Kawhia.

== Births ==
- 23 April (in Scotland): Edward Stafford, politician.

Undated

- William Henry Eyes, politician.
- (in England): John Gully, artist
- (in Scotland): James Macandrew, Superintendent of Otago, businessman.

Approximate

- (in Germany): Carl Sylvius Völkner, Protestant missionary.
- 9 or 19 January (in Ireland): William Travers, politician.

== See also ==
- List of years in New Zealand
- Timeline of New Zealand history
- History of New Zealand
- Military history of New Zealand
- Timeline of the New Zealand environment
- Timeline of New Zealand's links with Antarctica
