= 1816 in New Zealand =

- Decades: 1800s; 1810s; 1820s; 1830s
- See also: History of New Zealand; List of years in New Zealand; Timeline of New Zealand history

The following lists events that happened during 1816 in New Zealand.

== Incumbents ==
=== Regal and viceregal ===
- Head of State – King George III. With Prince George, Prince of Wales as prince regent.
- Governor of New South Wales – Lachlan Macquarie

== Events ==
- 22 January – Large numbers of Māori from North Cape, Whangaroa and Thames visit the mission at Rangihoua.
- February – Thomas and Elizabeth Hansen arrive at Oihi, Rangihoua from Port Jackson on the Active. They are the first non-missionary European family to settle in New Zealand. They eventually raised 11 children who all lived to at least their late 60s.
- March – Tui and Tītore, who arrived the previous year, leave Port Jackson (Sydney) for England in HMS Kangaroo. While there they may have helped Professor Samuel Lee start his Maori dictionary.
- 16 August – Thomas Kendall starts the first school in New Zealand, at Rangihoua. The opening roll is 33.

== Births ==
- 31 July (in Ireland): Trevor Chute, leader of British forces in the Second Taranaki War.

Undated

- William Daldy, politician
- (in England): Edward Dobson, Canterbury provincial engineer
- William Guyton, Mayor of Wellington
- John Wheeler King, the first European male born in New Zealand to reach adulthood
- Henry Tancred, politician

== Deaths ==
approximate

- Charlotte Badger; one of the first two female settlers in New Zealand.

== See also ==
- List of years in New Zealand
- Timeline of New Zealand history
- History of New Zealand
- Military history of New Zealand
- Timeline of the New Zealand environment
- Timeline of New Zealand's links with Antarctica
