= 1821 in New Zealand =

- Decades: 1800s; 1810s; 1820s; 1830s; 1840s
- See also: History of New Zealand; List of years in New Zealand; Timeline of New Zealand history

The following lists events that happened during 1821 in New Zealand.

== Events ==
- 12 July – Thomas Kendall, Hongi Hika and Waikato arrive back in the Bay of Islands from their trip to England. While in England they have helped to compile a Maori dictionary, met King George IV who gave Hongi a suit of armour, and Hongi has acquired a number of muskets (his primary purpose).
- 20 July – Grass is sown for the first time in New Zealand, on land cleared from fern at Kerikeri.
- 5 September – Hongi Hika and 2000 Ngā Puhi, armed with 1000 muskets, lay siege to Mauinaina pā at Tamaki. The pā is taken and the inhabitants massacred.
- September
  - – John Gare Butler and his family move into the Kerikeri Mission House even though it is still unfinished.

Undated

- Construction of the Kerikeri Mission House is started.
- Late in the year Hongi Hika and Ngā Puhi lay siege to the Ngāti Maru pā at Te Totara (Thames), but after 2 days they make peace with the defenders and withdraw. They return that night and take the pā without difficulty.
- Te Rauparaha and Ngāti Toa move south from Kawhia to resettle in Taranaki after several defeats by Waikato and Ngāti Maniapoto.

== Births ==
- 21 February (in Scotland): James Menzies, Superintendent of Southland Province.
- 12 July (in England): William Richmond, politician.
- 10 August (in England): John Turnbull Thomson, engineer and surveyor.
- 29 August (in Kerikeri): Elizabeth Fairburn (later Elizabeth Colenso), missionary and Bible translator.
- 10 September (in England): William Jervois, 10th Governor of New Zealand
- 2 November (in Ireland): George Bowen, 5th Governor of New Zealand.

Undated

- John Bacot, politician.
- (in England): Samuel Bealey, runholder and politician.
- (in England): Thomas Brunner, explorer.
- (in Scotland): John Cargill, politician.
- Oswald Curtis, politician.
- George Hunter, politician.
- (in England): Charles Kettle, surveyor of Dunedin.
- Reader Wood, politician.

Approximate

- (in England): William Montgomery, politician and merchant.
- (in Ireland): George O'Brien, painter.

== See also ==
- List of years in New Zealand
- Timeline of New Zealand history
- History of New Zealand
- Military history of New Zealand
- Timeline of the New Zealand environment
- Timeline of New Zealand's links with Antarctica
