= 1824 in New Zealand =

- Decades: 1800s; 1810s; 1820s; 1830s; 1840s
- See also: History of New Zealand; List of years in New Zealand; Timeline of New Zealand history

The following lists events that happened during 1824 in New Zealand.

== Incumbents ==
=== Regal and viceregal ===
- Head of State – King George IV
- Governor of New South Wales – Major-General Sir Thomas Brisbane is recalled on 29 December but only leaves in December 1825 when his successor, General Ralph Darling, arrives. Darling is appointed this year but only arrives in New South Wales on 25 December 1825.

== Events ==
- 3 April – George Clarke arrives in the Bay of Islands having taken passage from Sydney on board the French corvette La Coquille. La Coquille is commanded by Louis Isidore Duperrey, with Jules Dumont d'Urville as second-in-command, and will go on to complete a global circumnavigation.
- 31 August - The Revd. Henry Williams lays the keel for the 55-ton schooner Herald, the first sailing ship (schooner) built in New Zealand.

Undated

- George Clarke starts one of the first schools for Māori children, at Kerikeri.
- John Kelly marries (Mary) Hine-tuhawaiki and settles at Ruapuke Island. Hine may have been a relative of Tūhawaiki 'Bloody Jack', later paramount chief of Ngāi Tahu, whose stronghold was on Ruapuke.
- James Spencer sets up a trading post for whalers visiting Foveaux Strait at Bluff which is claimed to be the earliest permanent European settlement which will later grow into a town.

== Births ==
- 6 April (in England): George Waterhouse, 7th Premier of New Zealand.
- 1 May (in Germany): Julius von Haast, geologist
- 24 November (in England): Richard Barcham Shalders, founder of the YMCA in New Zealand.
- c. 18 December (in England): John Hall, 12th Premier of New Zealand
- 23 December (in England): Thomas Potts, naturalist.

Undated

- (in Ireland): Thomas Henry FitzGerald, politician.
- (in Australia): Gabriel Read, gold prospector.

== See also ==
- List of years in New Zealand
- Timeline of New Zealand history
- History of New Zealand
- Military history of New Zealand
- Timeline of the New Zealand environment
- Timeline of New Zealand's links with Antarctica
