= 1822 in New Zealand =

- Decades: 1800s; 1810s; 1820s; 1830s; 1840s
- See also: History of New Zealand; List of years in New Zealand; Timeline of New Zealand history

The following lists events that happened during 1822 in New Zealand.

== Events ==
- 22 January – Samuel Leigh and his wife arrive in the Bay of Islands to start the first Wesleyan mission. They stay at Te Puna with the Hall family of the Church Missionary Society for the next 16 months.
- January–February
  - – Hongi Hika leads 2000 Ngā Puhi south to attack Matakitaki pa near Pirongia.
- February–March
  - – Ngāti Toa under Te Raparaha leave the Taranaki and move to the Horowhenua-Kāpiti region.
- May
  - – The Ngā Puhi, armed with muskets, capture Matakitaki with great slaughter. Many of the defenders have not experienced musket warfare before and flee in panic trampling many to death. Te Wherowhero is one of the leaders of the defenders.
- August
  - – The Church Missionary Society decides to dismiss Thomas Kendall. (see 1823)
- November–December
  - – The sloop Snapper, Captain W. L. Edmondson, calls into Taiari / Chalky Inlet (southwestern Fiordland) and meets James Caddell, a tattooed European living with local Maori. Caddell guides them to Ruapuke Island and then to Bluff. (see 1810)
- 27 December – The Snapper is the first deep-sea vessel to enter what will become the port at Bluff. (see also 1813)

Undated

- The Kerikeri Mission House is completed.
- Ngāti Toa under senior chief Te Pēhi Kupe capture Kapiti Island.

== Births ==
- 10 March (in England): Charles Carter, contractor, philanthropist.
- 22 September (in England): James Crowe Richmond, politician and painter.
- 8 October (in France): Francis Dillon Bell, politician.

Unknown date

- Edward Connolly, politician.
- William Cutten, politician and newspaper publisher.

Approximate

- Tāwhiao, 2nd Māori king.

== See also ==
- History of New Zealand
- List of years in New Zealand
- Military history of New Zealand
- Timeline of New Zealand history
- Timeline of New Zealand's links with Antarctica
- Timeline of the New Zealand environment
