= 1827 in New Zealand =

- Decades: 1800s; 1810s; 1820s; 1830s; 1840s
- See also: History of New Zealand; List of years in New Zealand; Timeline of New Zealand history

The following lists events that happened during 1827 in New Zealand.

== Incumbents ==
=== Regal and viceregal ===
- Head of State – King George IV
- Governor of New South Wales – General Ralph Darling

== Events ==
- 23 – 28 January - Jules Dumont d'Urville is the first European to make the passage through the notoriously dangerous French Pass thus determining the insularity of the island which now bears his name. On 23rd he discovers the passage; on 25th he sails it in a ship's boat; and on 28th he takes the corvette Astrolabe through, considered a 'masterful feat of seamanship'.
- 30 January – The Rosanna leaves the Hokianga Harbour for Sydney signalling the end of the attempt by the 1825 New Zealand Company to settle New Zealand.
- January
  - – Ngāpuhi chief Hongi Hika is shot during a minor engagement at Mangamuka beach in the Hokianga. The wound is serious but Hongi survives for 14 months.
  - – The Wesleyan mission at Kaeo, near Whangaroa, is sacked by Ngāti Uru as they leave the area after the attack by Ngāpuhi.
- October
  - - The second sailing ship built in New Zealand, the 40-ton schooner Enterprise, is completed in the Horeke shipyard (also known as Deptford) in the Hokianga Harbour.
- September
  - – Captain William Wiseman in the Elizabeth on a flax trading voyage, names Port Cooper (now Lyttelton Harbour) after one of the owners of the Sydney trading firm, Cooper & Levy.

Undated

- John Guard establishes a whaling station at Te Awaiti on the Arapaoa Island shore of the Tory Channel. This is the first permanent land-based whaling station in New Zealand and the first European settlement in the South Island.
- Ngāti Toa chief Te Rauparaha begins attacks on South Island tribes.

== Births ==
Undated

- Joseph Dransfield, first mayor of Wellington.
- Dudley Ward, judge and politician.
- William Wood, politician.
- (in Scotland) William Fraser, politician

== See also ==
- List of years in New Zealand
- Timeline of New Zealand history
- History of New Zealand
- Military history of New Zealand
- Timeline of the New Zealand environment
- Timeline of New Zealand's links with Antarctica
