= Karamuramu Island =

Island in New Zealand

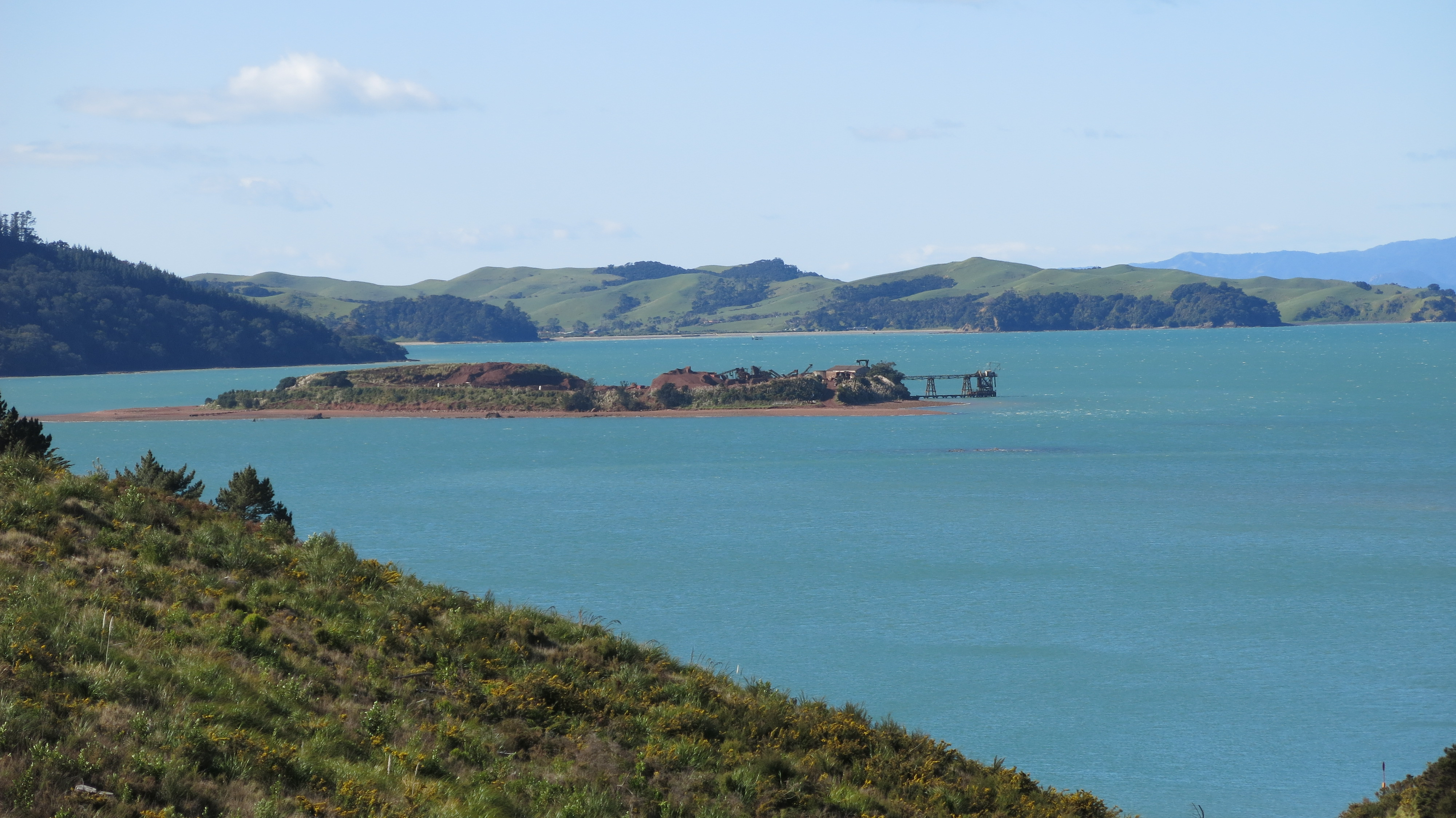

- Location within New Zealand

Geography
- Coordinates: 36.9245°S 175.1570°E
- Area: 0.06 km^{2} (0.023 sq mi)

Administration
- New Zealand

Karamuramu Island is a privately owned island located in the Hauraki Gulf, to the east of the city of Auckland, New Zealand. It is located to the south of Pakihi Island, in Kawakawa Bay (east of Beachlands and north-east of Clevedon). It is just over 1 km offshore from Waitawa Regional Park.

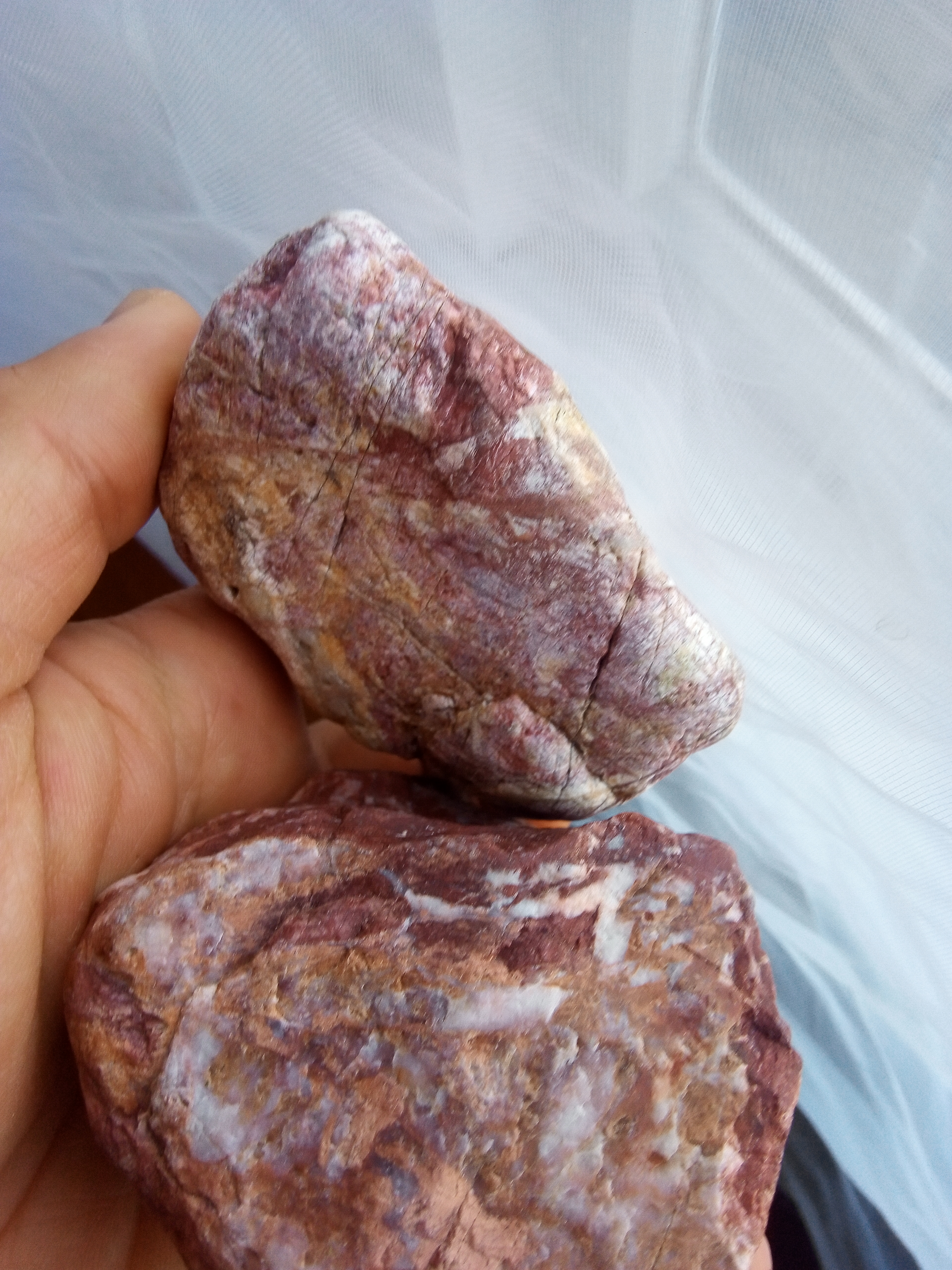
Red-coloured chert from Karamuramu Island

The island has an area of about 6.5 hectares (16 acres). The island is the site of a quarry which extracts a decorative red-coloured chert known as "McCallum chip". This, along with sand from the island, is primarily used as in aggregates to make decorative red concrete.

== History ==
The island was purchased from Sir John Logan Campbell by the McCallum family in 1894 (along with the neighbouring Pakihi Island). William Fraser McCallum and his brothers created a partnership in 1904 and established a quarry on the island in 1908. The red stone from the island has been used in many sites around Auckland, including Grafton Bridge and the Auckland Motorway shoulders. The McCallum family is still running the mining operations today.
