= Horomona Pōhio =

Horomona Pōhio.

Horomona Pōhio (1815–1880) was a New Zealand Māori leader, missionary, assessor and land protester. Of Māori descent, he identified with the Ngāi Tahu iwi, the main tribe in South New Zealand. He was born in Wainono, South Canterbury, New Zealand in 1815.
