= George Boyd (potter) =

New Zealand potter

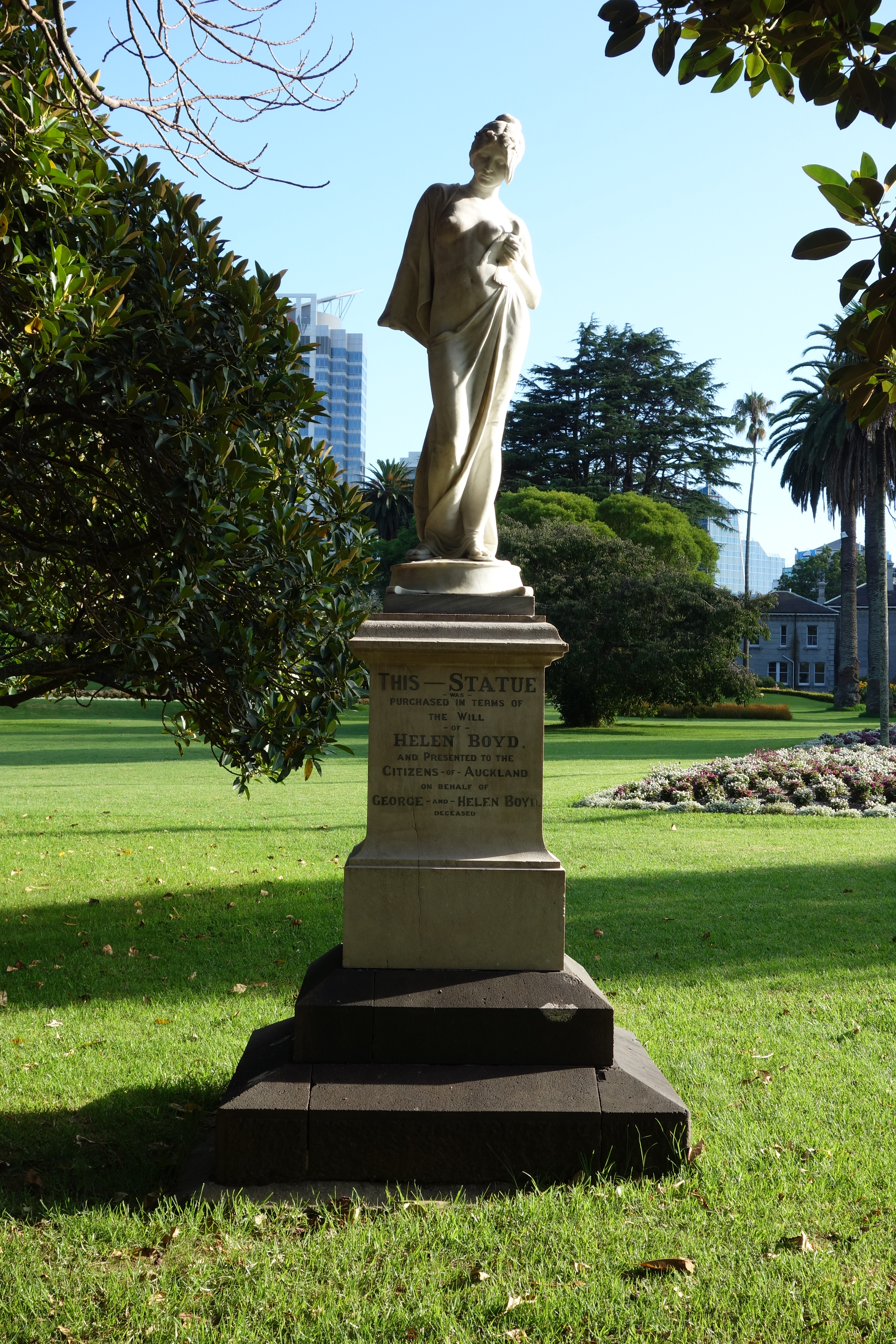
The Boyd statue in Albert Park, Auckland, erected from a bequest by George Boyd's wife Helen

George Boyd (1825–1886) was an early New Zealand studio potter.

Boyd trained as a potter in Ireland before immigrating to New Zealand. In 1851 he settled in Auckland. Nine years later he set up his own business, the Newton Pottery. Although mainly producing functional items, he also earned a reputation for ornamental wares. In 1885 he exhibited a range of his products at the New Zealand Industrial Exhibition in Wellington, New Zealand. The judges commended Boyd's 'most attractive show of pottery' saying his work proved there could be 'a real art-feeling in the manufacture of cheap and common goods'. Following the exhibition, he gave a selection of his 'artistic wares' to the Colonial Museum, a predecessor of the Museum of New Zealand Te Papa Tongarewa.

When he died in 1886, his will ordered the executors to close down the Newton Pottery, sell the machinery, and destroy the moulds. Examples of his work are now rare and highly sought after. His wife Helen died in 1898.
