= Pakatoa Island =

Island in New Zealand

Māori:
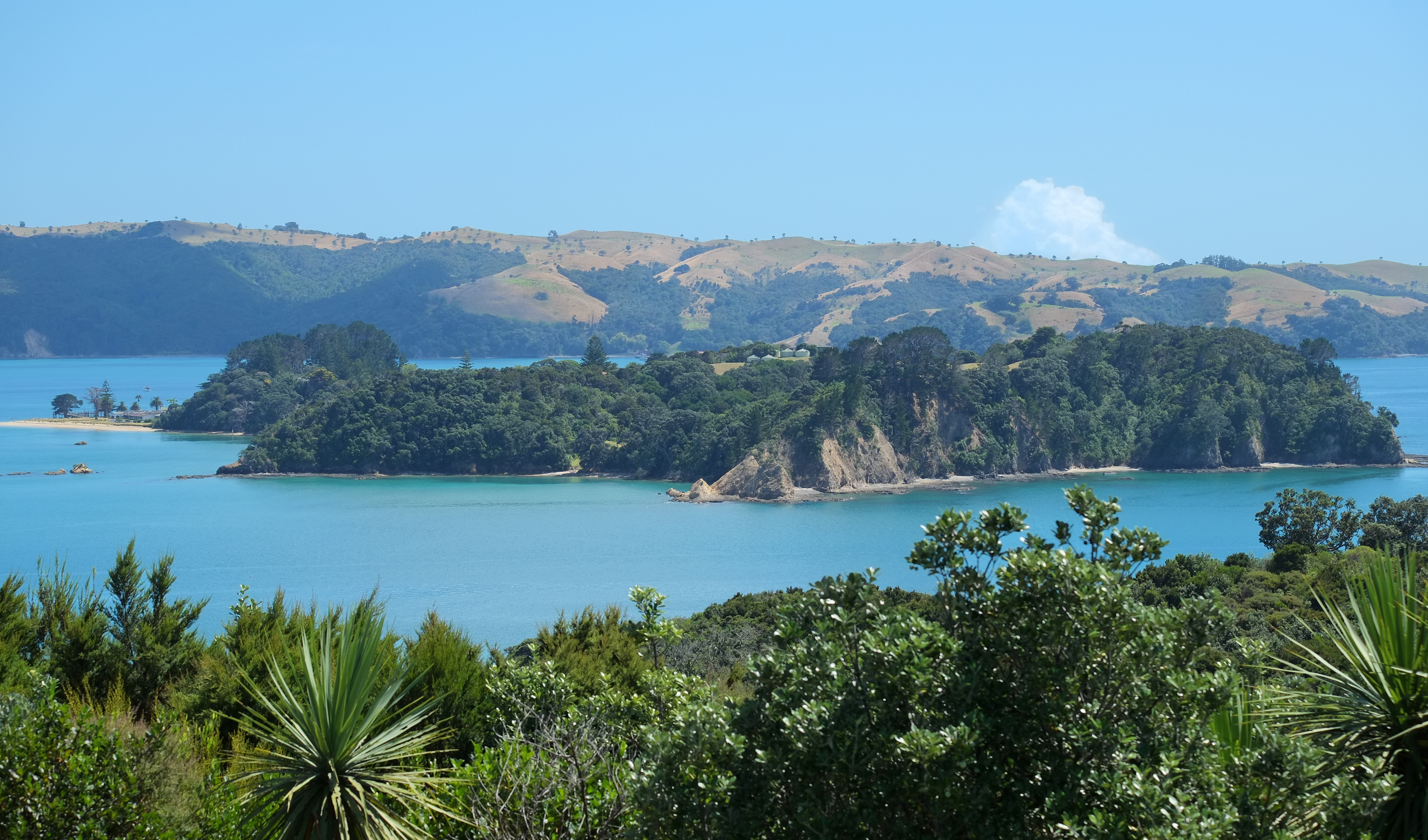
- Pakatoa Island seen from Rotoroa Island
- Interactive map of Pakatoa Island

Geography
- Location: Auckland Region
- Coordinates: 36°47′44″S 175°11′37″E
- Area: 24 ha (59 acres)

Administration
- New Zealand

Demographics
- Population: 2 (caretakers) (2017)

Pakatoa Island, previously known as Bell's Island, is one of the islands located in the Hauraki Gulf of New Zealand, covering 24 hectares (59 acres). The island is owned by New Zealand businessman, John Ramsay.

== History ==
The 23rd September 1826, is the first record of land purchase for Pakatoa Island, by the New Zealand Company. Three other Islands were purchased at this time, Ponui Island, Rotoroa Island and Pakihi Island. The deed of purchase shows that the land was sold for one double-barreled gun, eight muskets, and one barrel of gunpowder. The deed was translated and signed by New Zealand missionary, Thomas Kendall, and witnessed by three men from the New Zealand Company ship Rosanna and 15 Māori.

The island was then purchased in 1907 by the Salvation Army and used as an alcohol treatment centre for men for two years before a larger rehabilitation centre was built on Rotoroa Island. Pakatoa Island then became a women's only rehabilitation facility. From 1943 it became a rest home for the elderly.

In 1949 the island was bought at public auction for £5800 by Mr J. L. Faulkner, with intention to use for farming.

For almost 20 years, from the 1960s to 1980s, the island was used as a resort. Development on the island included a tourist resort, a landing strip and a nine-hole golf course. Actor Russell Crowe once worked at the resort in his youth.

John Ramsey purchased the island in 1994 for $4.25m NZD.
