= 1820 in New Zealand =

- Decades: 1800s; 1810s; 1820s; 1830s; 1840s
- See also: History of New Zealand; List of years in New Zealand; Timeline of New Zealand history

The following lists events that happened during 1820 in New Zealand.

== Incumbents ==
=== Regal and viceregal ===
Any reference to New Zealand in a legal rather than geographic sense prior to 1840 is complex and unclear. When the British colony of New South Wales was founded in 1788 it nominally included New Zealand as far as 43°39'S (approximately halfway down the South Island).

- Head of State – King George III dies on 29 January. He is succeeded by King George IV who has been the prince regent since 1811.
- Governor of New South Wales – Lachlan Macquarie's offer to resign is finally accepted at the end of the year but he does not leave New South Wales until 12 February 1822. His successor, Major-General Sir Thomas Brisbane, is advised of his appointment on 3 November, but does not arrive in Sydney until 7 November 1821.

== Events ==
- 27 February – Samuel Marsden arrives on his third visit to New Zealand aboard HMS Dromedary. He unsuccessfully attempts to dissuade Thomas Kendall from his impending visit to England. The Dromedary spends 5-month getting timber in Whangaroa Harbour.
- 2 March – Kendall, Hongi Hika, and Hongi's nephew Waikato from Rangihoua, sail for England in the whaler New Zealander. Kendall confers with Professor Samuel Lee at Cambridge on the publication of Grammar and Vocabulary of the New Zealand Language. The book is published at the end of the year. The well known painting of Kendall with the two chiefs is painted by James Barry. Hongi's main purpose in this trip is to obtain muskets, at which he is eventually successful.
- 3 May – A plough is used for the first time in New Zealand when John Gare Butler drives a team of six bullocks at Kerikeri.
- 14 July – Marsden's second visit to Tamaki Makaurau (Auckland), on HMS Coromandel. He climbs Maungarei / Mount Wellington and is the first European to sight Manukau Harbour. He may also have preached at or near Maraetai at this time. Marsden returns to the Bay of Islands via the Kaipara Harbour and is one of the first Europeans to see the harbour and the site of future Dargaville.
- 27 August – Captain R.A. Cruise of the 84th Regiment visits Tamaki Makaurau on the colonial schooner Prince Regent.
- 9 November – Marsden again visits Tamaki Makaurau, this time with Butler. They visit Tamaki River and cross the isthmus to Manukau Harbour and visit Onehunga and the Manukau Heads but cannot exit the harbour because of the bar at the entrance.
- 12 November – Kendall is ordained as a priest by Bowyer Sparke, Bishop of Ely.
- 5 December – Marsden leaves at the end of his third visit.

=== Undated ===
- Fabian Gottlieb von Bellingshausen, a naval officer for the Russian Empire, visits the Marlborough Sounds for nine days in Mirnyi and Vostock. His ships may have been those seen by Te Rauparaha around this time.
- Marsden is the first European to see Tauranga Harbour.
- Waikato and Ngāti Maniapoto defeat Ngāti Toa in two battles near at Kāwhia Harbour. After a siege at the harbour Ngāti Toa agree to cede their land and move south. Te Wherowhero is one of the leaders of Waikato, Te Rauparaha and Te Pēhi Kupe lead Ngāti Toa.

== Births ==
- 11 March (in England): Walter Mantell, scientist and politician.
- 25 June (in England): Jerningham Wakefield, politician and writer
- 27 October (in Scotland): Donald McLean, politician.

Undated

- (in India): Charles Borlase, politician.
- Charles Brown, politician.
- Robert Graham, politician.
- (in Scotland): William Hutchison, politician.
- (in Scotland): James Mckenzie, outlaw.
- Loughlin O'Brien, politician.
- Alfred Saunders, politician.

Approximate

- (in England): Charles Heaphy, surveyor, VC.
- (in England): Mary Ann Müller, suffragist

== Deaths ==
- 19 June (in England): Joseph Banks, naturalist on Cook's first voyage.

== See also ==
- List of years in New Zealand
- Timeline of New Zealand history
- History of New Zealand
- Military history of New Zealand
- Timeline of the New Zealand environment
- Timeline of New Zealand's links with Antarctica
