= Ponui Island =

Island in New Zealand

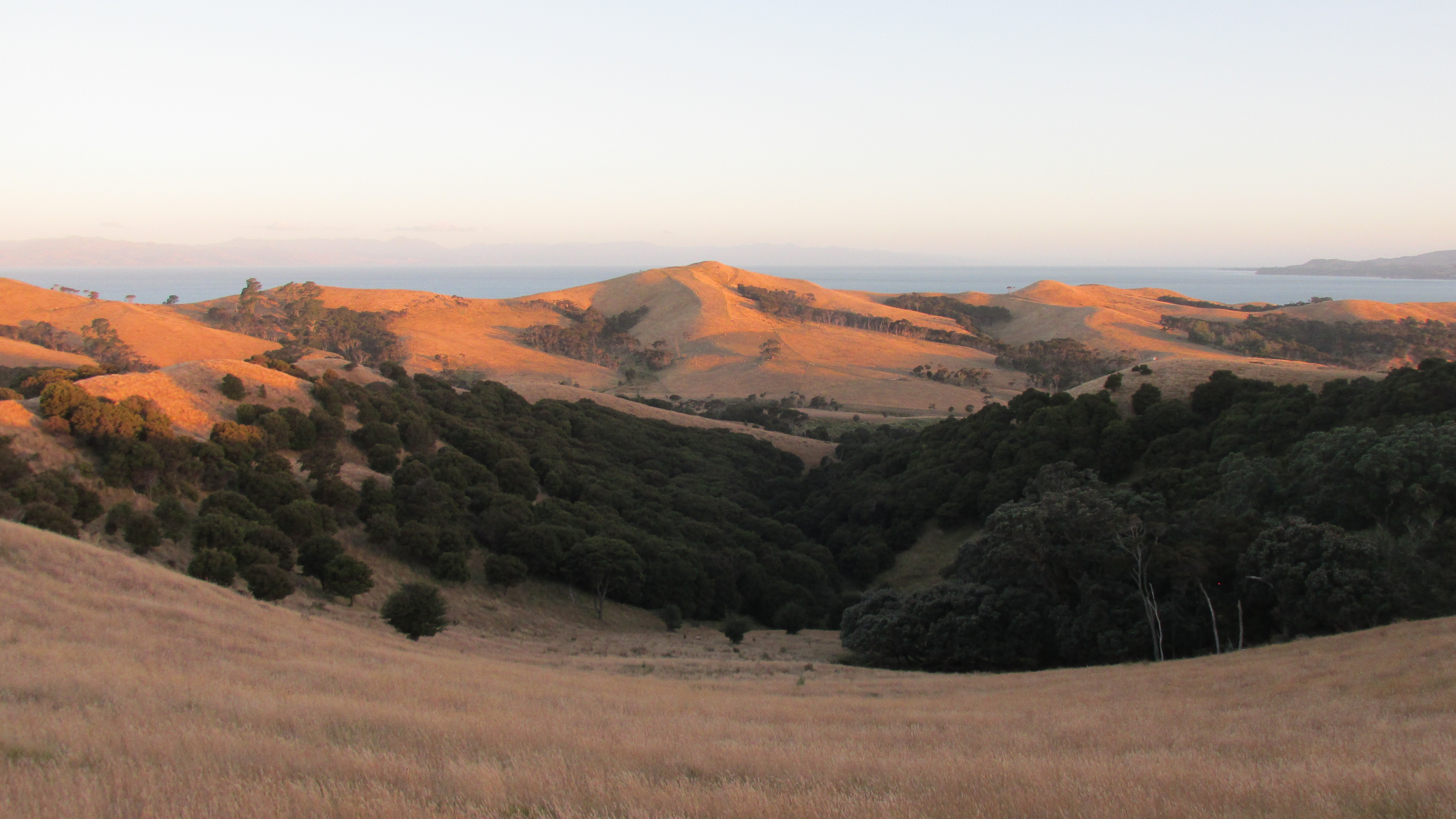
- Farmland and native bush on Ponui Island

- Location in New Zealand & Pacific Ocean Ponui Island (Pacific Ocean)
- Interactive map of Ponui Island

Geography
- Location: Hauraki Gulf
- Coordinates: 36°52′S 175°11′E
- Area: 18 km^{2} (6.9 sq mi)
- Highest elevation: 173 m (568 ft)
- Highest point: Ponui

Administration
- New Zealand

Ponui Island (also known as Chamberlins Island) is a privately owned island located in the Hauraki Gulf, 30km to the east of the city of Auckland, New Zealand. The island has an area of 18 km^{2} and is located to the southeast of Waiheke Island, at the eastern end of the Tamaki Strait, which separates the island from the Hunua Ranges on the mainland to the south.

== History ==
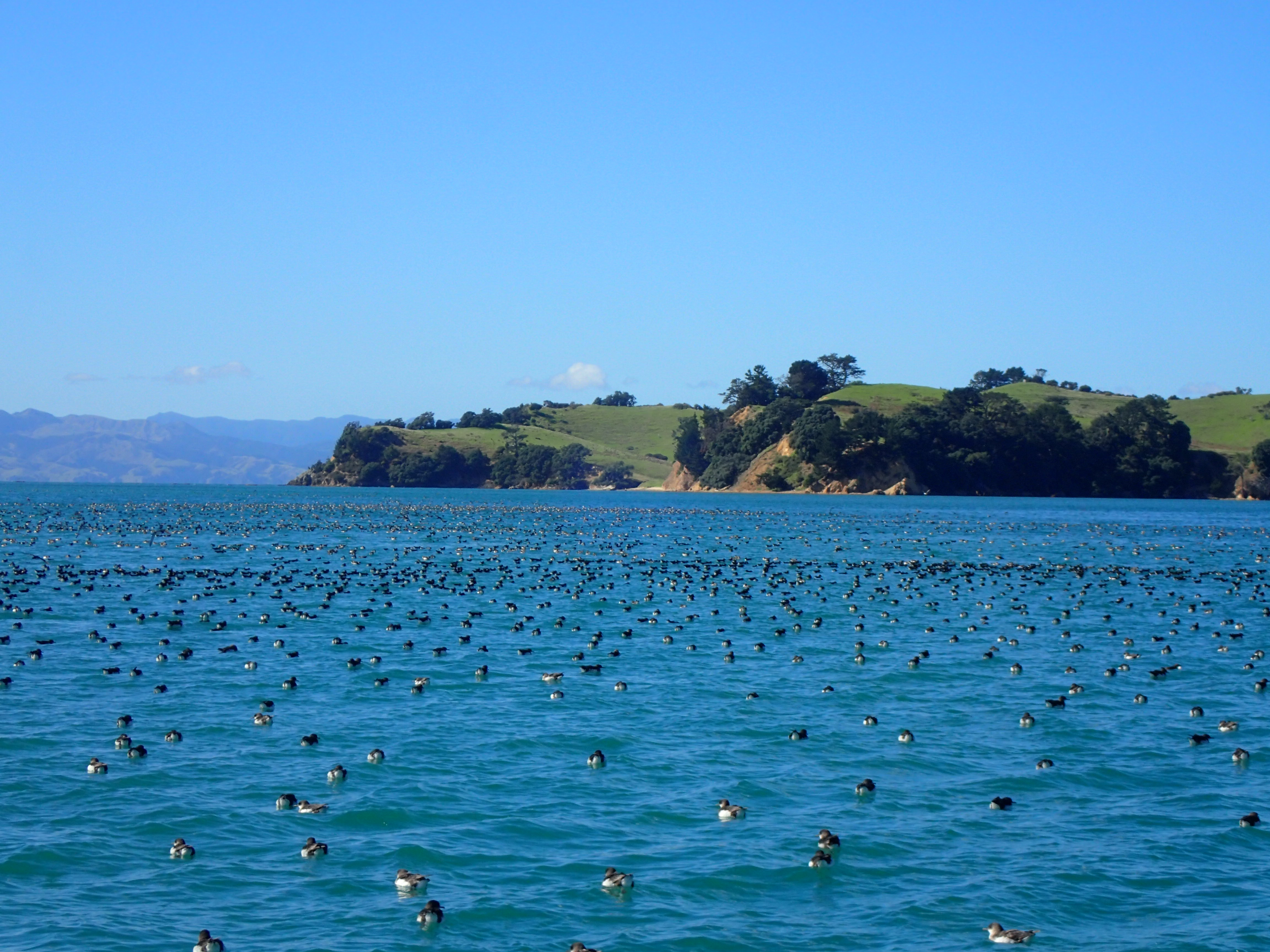
Fluttering shearwaters, waiting off Ponui Island for the next fishing excursion

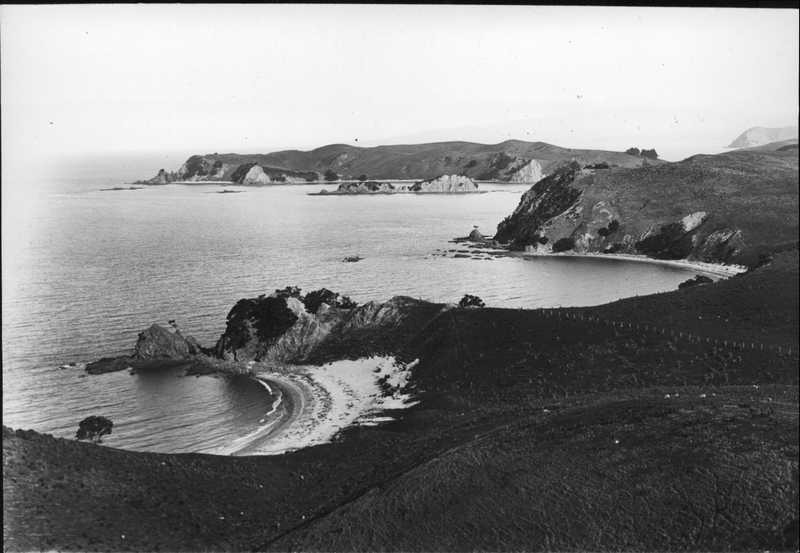
Ponui Island in the background, 1902

The island is the site of some of the earliest archaeological remains of early Māori in the Auckland region, dating to at least the 1400s.

The first record of land purchase for Ponui Island was on 23 September 1826 by the New Zealand Company in their earliest planned venture to colonise New Zealand. Three other islands were purchased at this time, Pakatoa Island, Rotoroa Island and Pakihi Island. It is recorded that the land was sold for one double-barreled gun, eight muskets, and one barrel of gunpowder, with the deed translated and signed by Thomas Kendall, and witnessed by three men from the ship Rosanna and 15 Māori.

In 1853, the island was bought and occupied by the Chamberlin family. From the 1880s until the early 20th century, stone and sand from the island was extracted for use in concrete structures in Auckland, notably, Grafton Bridge. In the early 1900s, a considerable amount of kauri was logged and bush was burnt off for cattle grazing on the southern end of the island.

The Pupuke, a New Zealand passenger ferry built in 1909, beached at Oranga Bay on the island in 1962. The other shipwreck at Oranga Bay was the Australian steel steamer (bought by Auckland machinery merchant Mr. F. Appleton in 1927) the Kurnalpi.

The island remains privately owned and consists of three farms. The only permanent inhabitants (nine in the 2001 census) are associated with the farms, which are predominantly used for sheep.

The island is a popular site for youth camps for organisations such as Scouts. Crusader camps (now under the banner of Scripture Union) have been held on the island since 1932.

== Biodiversity ==
The island is the home of New Zealand's only feral donkey breed, the Ponui donkey. It has a large number of ship rats, and populations of brown rats, mice and feral cats.

Ponui Island's avian fauna includes common native forest species: the grey warbler (riroriro), fantail (piwakawaka), silvereye (tauhou), tūī, kererū and morepork (ruru). North Island brown kiwi were introduced to the island by the New Zealand Wildlife Service, a forerunner of the Department of Conservation, in 1964, at the request of the island's owner. Fourteen kiwi were released, six from Little Barrier Island and eight from Northland. Ponui now has one of the highest densities of the North Island brown kiwi anywhere in New Zealand. The Department of Conservation has no plans to take Ponui kiwi to supplement existing populations elsewhere, because of their mixed genetic origins, according to a 2006 report, but in 2025 ten kiwi were translocated to nearby Waiheke Island, which had no existing population.
