= Anton Seuffert =

Anton Seuffert (c. 1815 – 6 August 1887) was born in Bohemia. He was a cabinetmaker with a particular expertise in the art of marquetry.

Anton Seuffert, also known as Anton Seufert, learned his craft from his father, Anton Seufert senior, who was also a cabinetmaker. Seuffert worked in Vienna for the Austrian furniture manufacturing company Leistler, rising to the position of foreman. He was sent by his firm to England in order to assemble furniture for the royal places and also to set up the firm's large display of luxury wooden furniture for the Great Exhibition of 1851 in London. He stayed in England for several years and married Anna Piltz in 1855 or 1856. He emigrated to New Zealand from London on the ship Caduceus with his wife and two children, Josefieni, and William, and arrived in Auckland on 19 May 1859 (surname was spelt Senfick/Senfert). The family settled in Auckland and increased by a further five children. Juliena was born in September 1860, Augusta Amelia in August 1862, Albert in October 1864, Charles Antonis in March 1867 and the youngest Adolf Herman in October 1869. Adolf died of typhoid fever at 11 years of age.

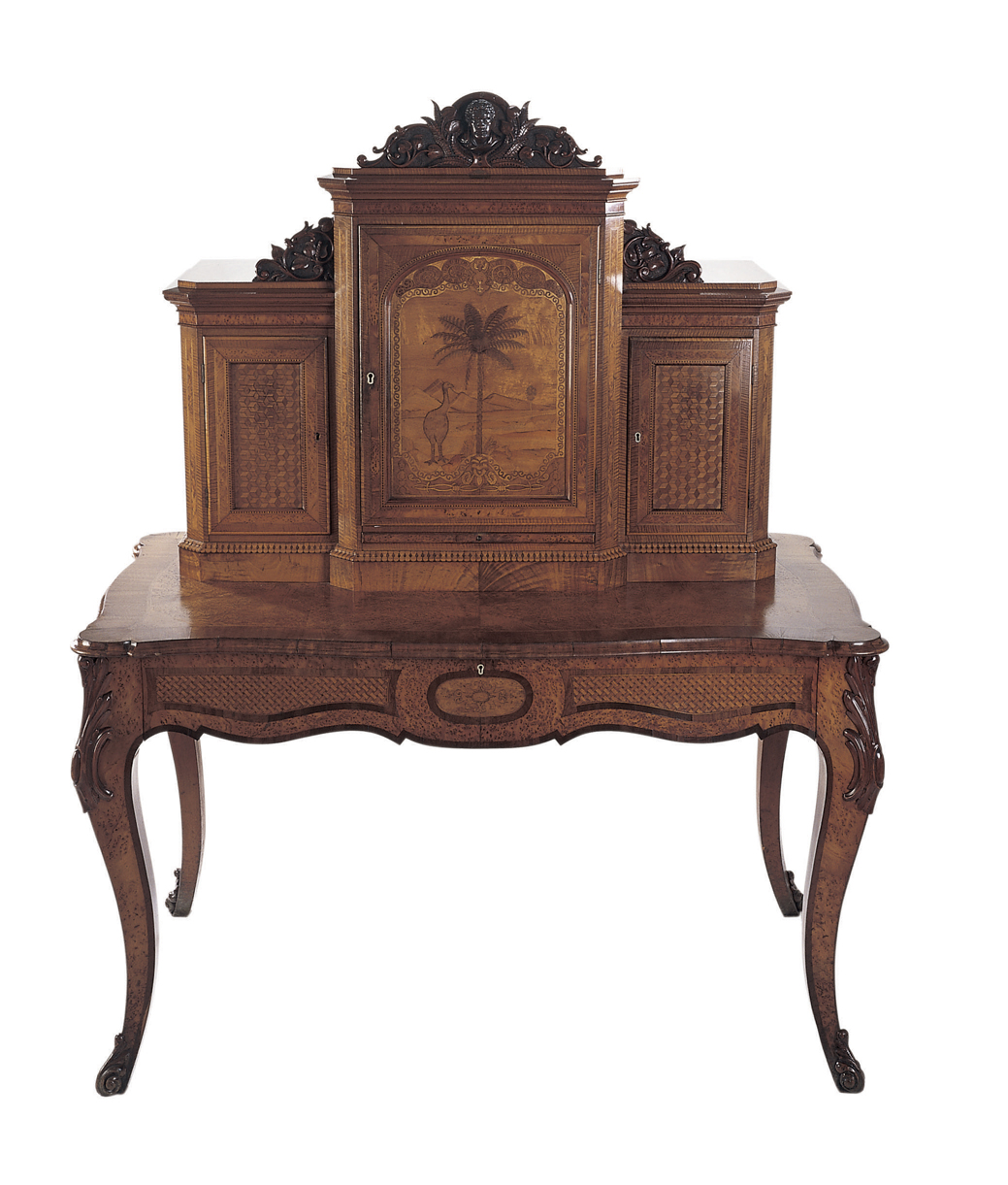
bonheur du jour by Anton Seuffert, carvings by Anton Teutenberg, Auckland, New Zealand, about 1865

For nearly thirty years Seuffert made fine furniture for the houses of wealthy families in New Zealand and overseas experimenting with and using the native timbers of New Zealand. It is possible that he first became familiar with New Zealand timbers while he was in London through his contact with Johann Levien who had spent several years in New Zealand. Certainly the demands of the marquetry technique ensured that Sueffert became an expert in the properties of New Zealand timber and it is likely he made detailed studies of native woods to maximise the impact of his intricate designs.

His reputation as a cabinetmaker of international distinction was cemented when, in 1862, Sueffert received a lot of publicity for his work when he made a writing cabinet using New Zealand woods, 'consisting of 30,000 pieces, valued at 300 guineas, which was purchased and presented by the citizens of Auckland to her Majesty the Queen Victoria. The cabinet is still in the Royal Collection at Buckingham Palace. He also produced a series of up to nine writing cabinets also known as Louis XV escritoire or bonheur du jour cabinets. Each of the cabinets are known by the name of the recipient and include the 'Watt cabinet' constructed for Archibald Anderson Watt, the 'Hooker cabinet' constructed for Sir Joseph Hooker, and the 'Grey cabinet' constructed for Governor George Grey. In addition to cabinets he also made tables, boxes of various sizes and covers for books of pressed ferns, as well as panels for the Governor Grey's library at Mansion House, Grey's residence on Kawau Island. All Seuffert's work was intricately inlaid and most included designs with New Zealand imagery including very accurately depicted native flora and fauna.

In 1869 Queen Victoria's second son The Prince Alfred, Duke of Edinburgh, visited New Zealand in his naval role as captain of HMS Galetea. Seuffert built a bed and a chest of drawers for the Duke's use during his 1869 stay and received a Royal Appointment. Seuffert used this as an opportunity to change the design of his work labels as well as the spelling of his surname from Seufert to Seuffert.

Seuffert entered his works in the international exhibitions of 1862, 1873, 1879, and 1880–81, the New Zealand Exhibition in Dunedin 1865 and the Colonial and Indian Exhibition in 1886 and won numerous prizes.

He became a naturalised New Zealander in 1861. His wife, Anna Seuffert, also had a business – a fancy goods shop – which may have supported the family, while Seuffert worked on his commissions. Seuffert passed on his skills to his son, William, who took over the business when his father died on 6 August 1887.

== List of works ==
- Works by Anton Seuffert in the collection of the Museum of New Zealand Te Papa Tongarewa
