= Rotoroa Island =

Island in New Zealand

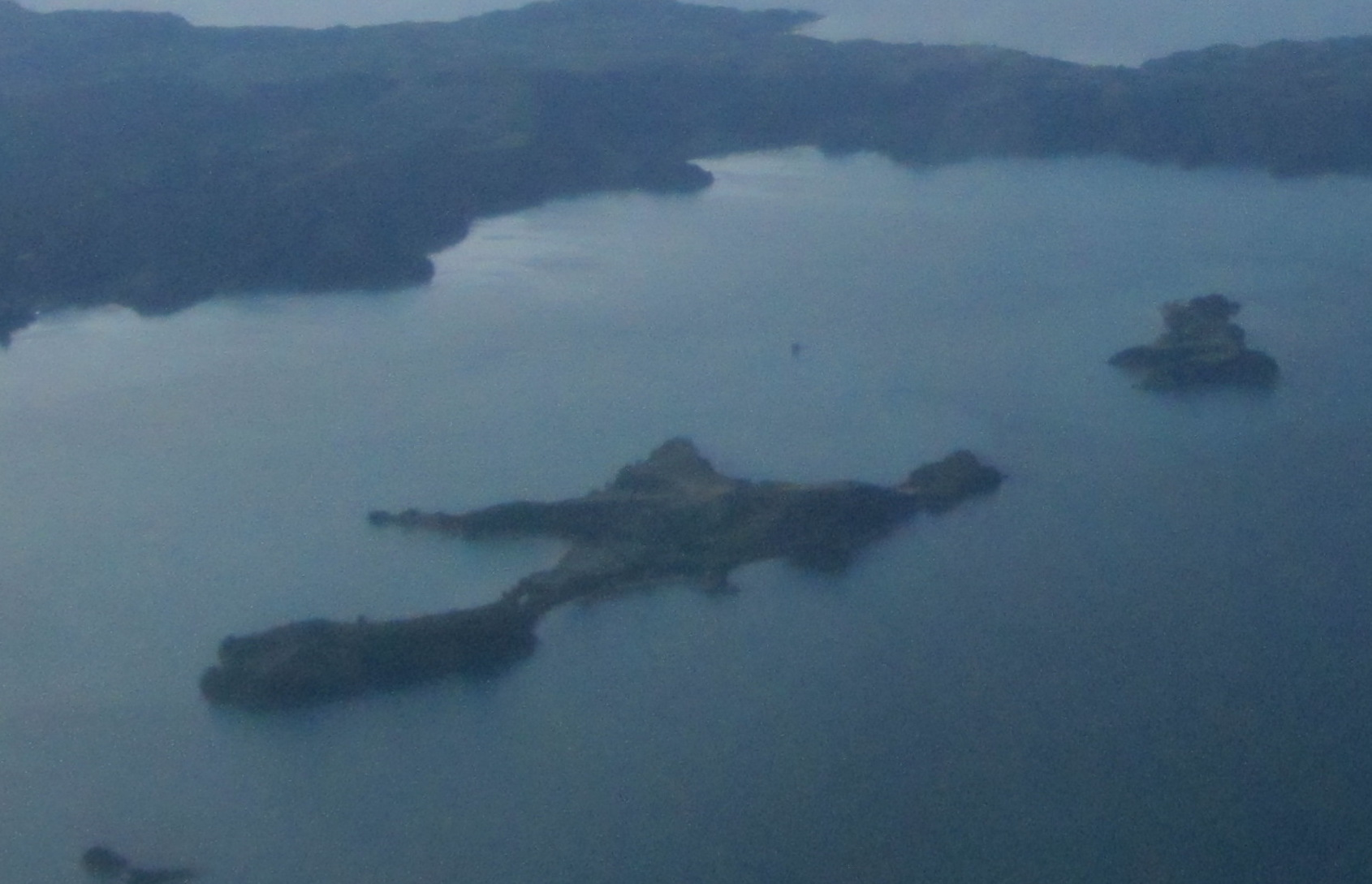
- Rotoroa Island, with Pakatoa Island to the right and eastern Waiheke Island in the background
- Interactive map of Rotoroa Island

Geography
- Location: Auckland Region
- Coordinates: 36°49′S 175°12′E
- Area: 82 ha (200 acres)

Administration
- New Zealand

Demographics
- Population: 0 (2018)

Rotoroa Island (formerly known as Ruthe's Island) is an island to the east of Waiheke Island in the Hauraki Gulf of New Zealand. It is just over an hour away by ferry from the Auckland ferry terminal. It covers 82 hectares (200 acres).

== History ==
Due to the lack of natural springs or other fresh water sources, Māori only visited the island.

Record of land purchase by the New Zealand Company, arriving on the Rosanna, dates to 23 September 1826. Rotoroa Island along with neighbouring Pakatoa Island and Pakihi Island were sold for one double-barreled gun, eight muskets, and one barrel of gunpowder. The deed was translated and co-signed by Thomas Kendall, and witnessed by three company men and 15 Māori.

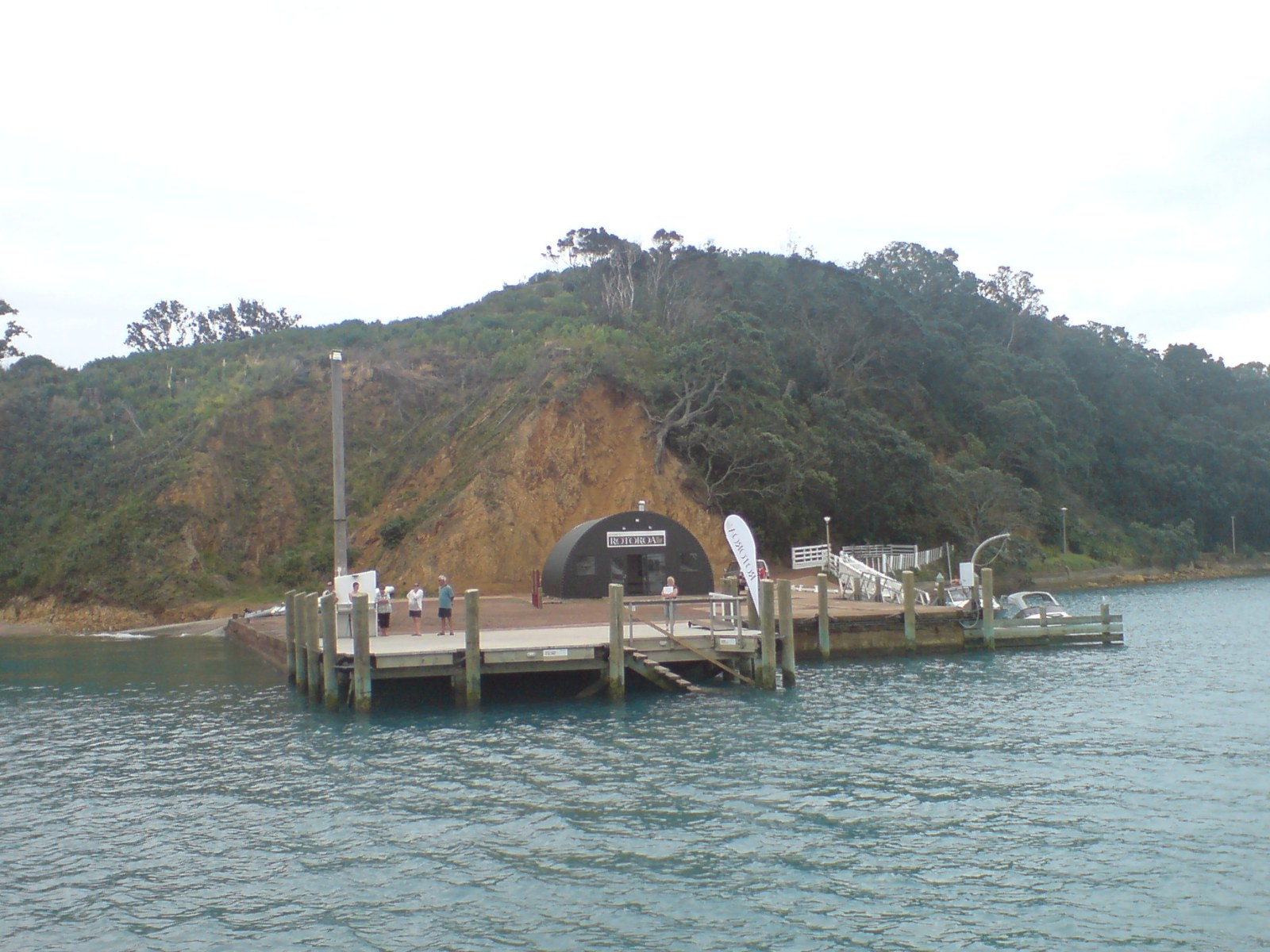
Rotoroa Island ferry wharf

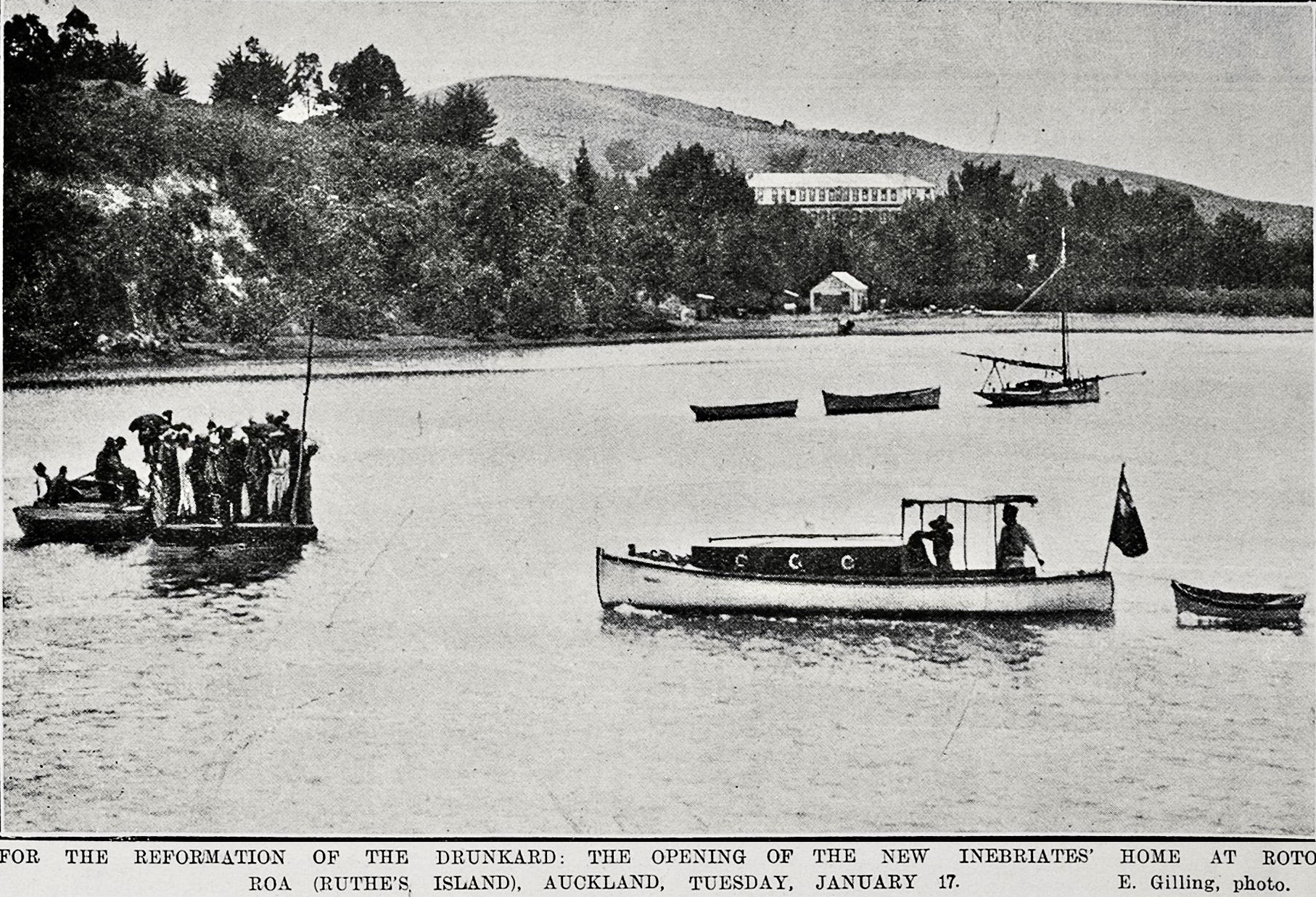
Roto Roa Island Inebriates Home in 1911

The Salvation Army purchased it for £400 in 1908 from the Ruthe family to expand their alcohol and drug rehabilitation facility at nearby Pakatoa Island. Men were treated at Home Bay at Rotoroa, while women were treated at Pakatoa. This treatment facility was closed in 2005.

In 2008, philanthropists Neal and Annette Plowman negotiated a 99-year lease from the Salvation Army, establishing the Rotoroa Island Trust, and created a program of restoration and redevelopment, designed to return island access to the people of New Zealand. Rotoroa Island opened to the public for the first time in over 100 years in February 2011.

== Conservation ==
The Rotoroa Island Trust partnered with Auckland Zoo to establish the island as a conservation sanctuary. Due to the island's status as pest free, natives birds such as takahē, pāteke (brown teal), tīeke (saddleback), Grey-faced petrel, Weka and North Island brown kiwi were identified as suitable species for translocation to the island. Species such as the takehē, tieke, kiwi, popokotea, shore skinks, moko skinks, and pateke have all been translocated to the island as part of a wider endangered species breeding programme.

=== Kiwi ===
Rotoroa Island is a creche site for Coromandel brown kiwi. The chicks are released on Rotoroa Island when they are just a few weeks old, weighing 250-300g and are able to grow up in the safety of the island. Every two years, Rotoroa Island does a kiwi muster for adult birds. Weighing about 1 kg, the mature kiwi are better able to defend themselves against predators such as stoats and feral cats. Some are returned to the Coromandel, while others are taken to nearby Motutapu Island to establish a new population.

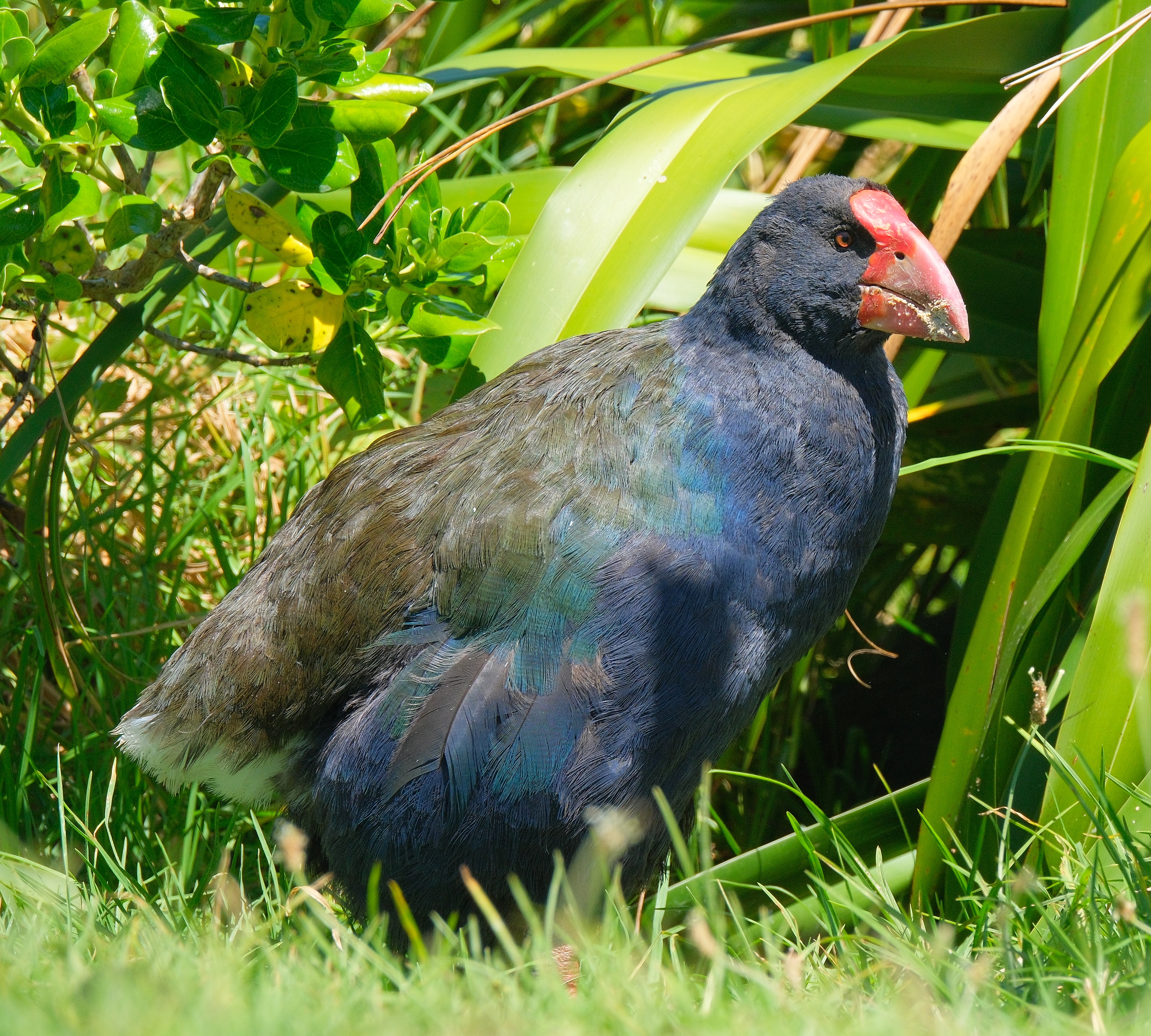
Takahē at Rotoroa Island, 2024.

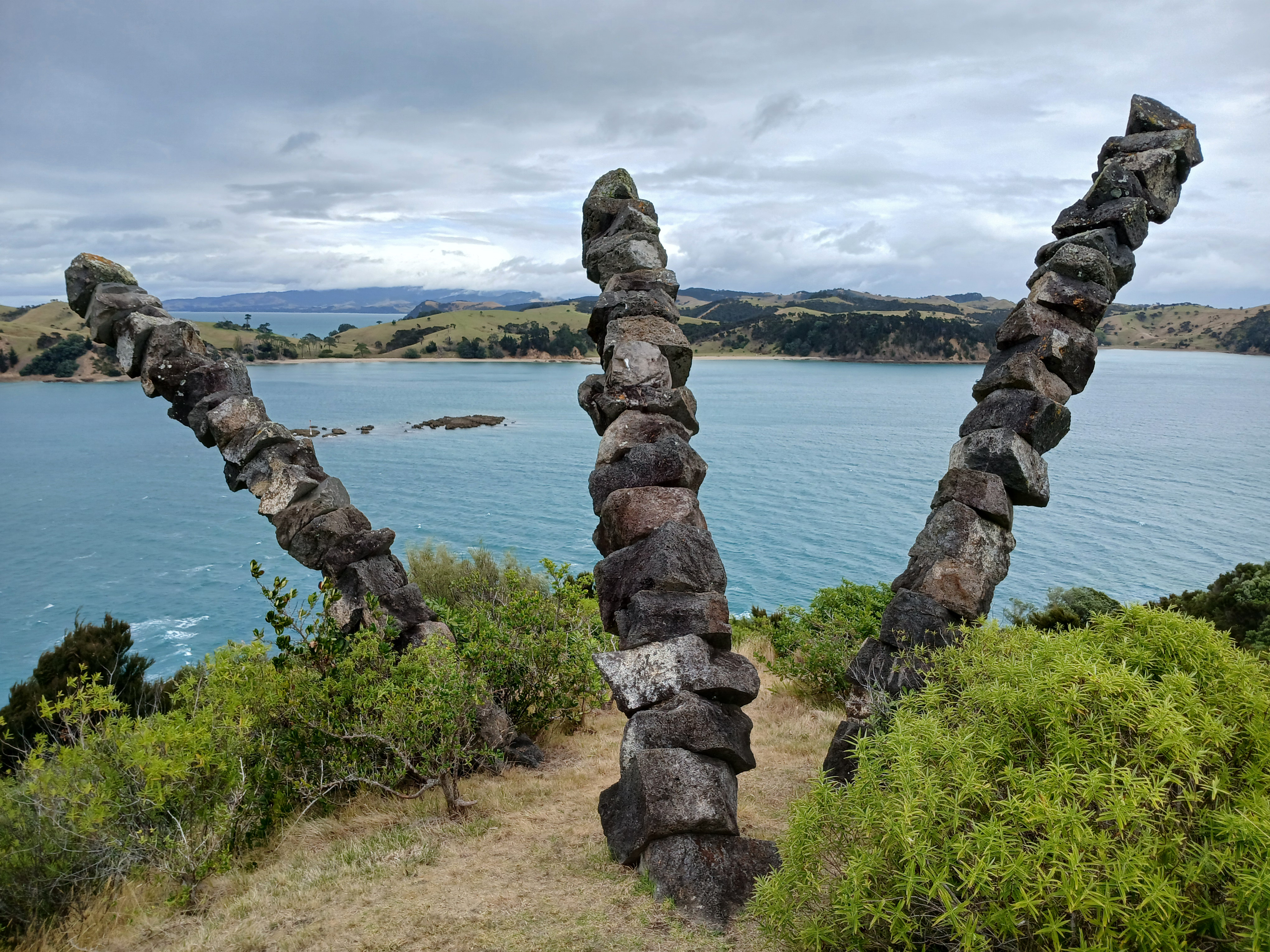
Kaitiaki (Guardian of the island). A sculpture by Chris Booth installed in April 2011.

=== Takahē ===
The Takahē Recovery Programme, managed by the Department of Conservation, iwi and Fulton Hogan aims to protect and promote population growth of takahē. Rotorua Island has been identified as a safe site for takahē and is one of the locations working toward establishing 125 breeding pairs.

== Restoration programme ==
By 2011, when the island was opened to the public, over 20,000 pine trees were removed and over 400,000 native New Zealand trees were planted. This included 27 different species. Rotoroa Island followed an extensive pest eradication programme, and has a pest-free status.

The Rotoroa Island Museum opened in 2011. The building was designed in the style of a New Zealand wool shed by architect Rick Pearson of Pearson & Associates Architects Ltd. In 2011 the building won an Auckland Architecture Award.

Three holiday homes and a shared hostel accommodation were restored, enabling the public to stay overnight on the island.

The sculpture, Kaitiaki (2010–2011) by New Zealand artist Chris Booth is located at the island's southern point.

== Flora ==
In August 2018, Kauri seedlings were donated to the Rotoroa Island Trust by Kauri 2000 Trust and BNZ.

Rotoroa Island is a carbon neutral island. All the trees planted are calculated to remove twice the carbon emitted.

== Climate ==
Climate data for Rotoroa Island (1981-2010)
Month	Jan	Feb	Mar	Apr	May	Jun	Jul	Aug	Sep	Oct	Nov	Dec	Year
Mean daily maximum °C (°F)	22.6 (72.7)	23.4 (74.1)	21.9 (71.4)	19.5 (67.1)	17.1 (62.8)	14.9 (58.8)	14 (57)	14.4 (57.9)	15.7 (60.3)	17 (63)	18.8 (65.8)	21.1 (70.0)	18.4 (65.1)
Daily mean °C (°F)	19.7 (67.5)	20.4 (68.7)	19 (66)	17 (63)	14.8 (58.6)	12.5 (54.5)	11.5 (52.7)	11.9 (53.4)	13.1 (55.6)	14.3 (57.7)	16 (61)	18.2 (64.8)	15.7 (60.3)
Mean daily minimum °C (°F)	16.7 (62.1)	17.5 (63.5)	16.1 (61.0)	14.6 (58.3)	12.5 (54.5)	10.2 (50.4)	9.1 (48.4)	9.3 (48.7)	10.6 (51.1)	11.7 (53.1)	13.2 (55.8)	15.4 (59.7)	13.1 (55.5)
Source: NIWA
