= Pakihi Island =

Island in New Zealand

- Location within New Zealand

Geography
- Coordinates: 36.908°S 175.164°E

Administration
- New Zealand

Pakihi Island is a privately owned island located in the Hauraki Gulf to the east of the city of Auckland, New Zealand. With an area of 114 hectares (280 acres), it is one of the smallest of the Hauraki Gulf Islands. It is located 1 km southwest of Ponui Island, and 1.5 km offshore from Waitawa Regional Park.

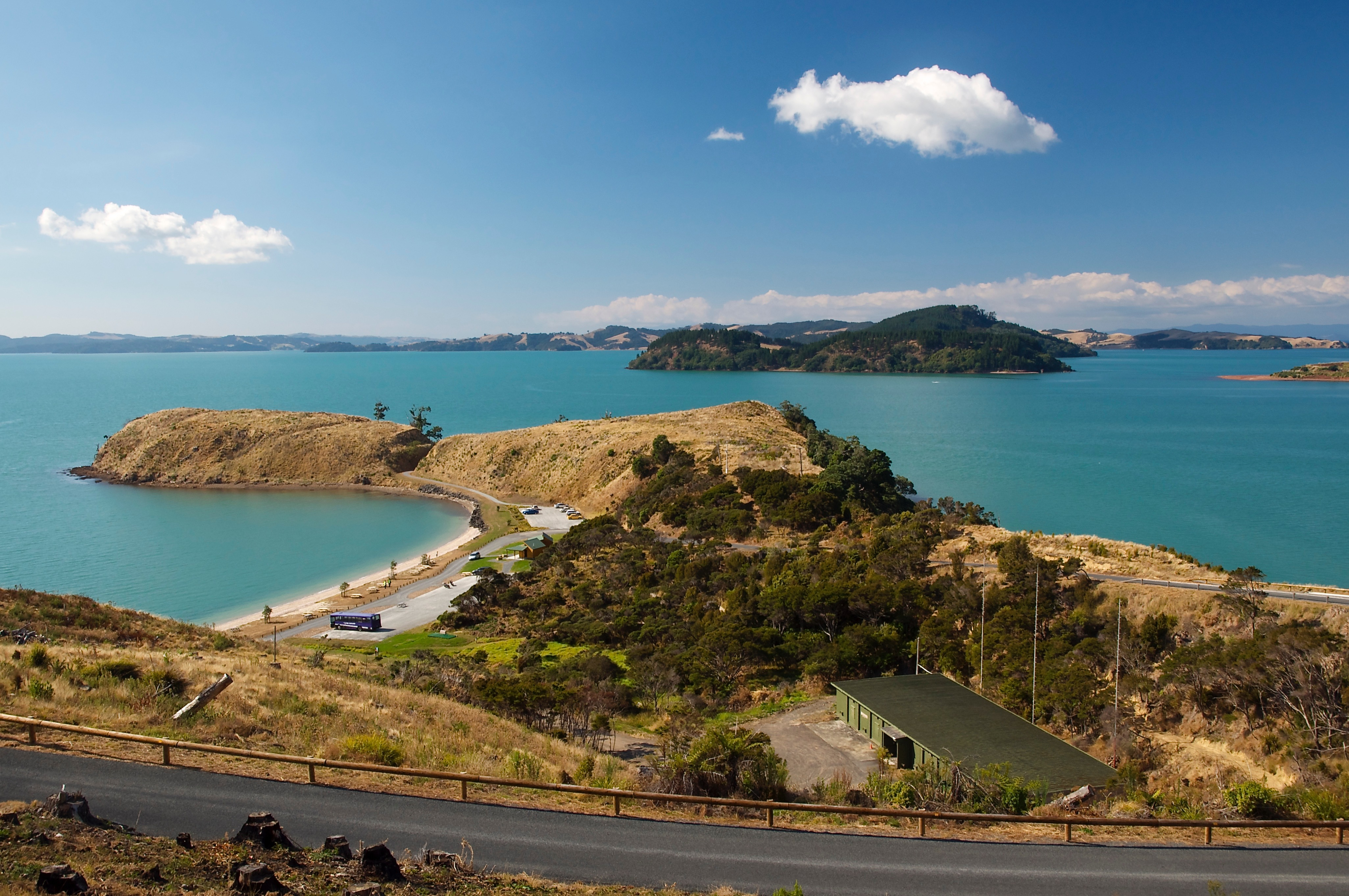
Looking towards Pakihi Island (in the centre of the photo) from Waitawa Regional Park. (Ponui Island is in the background, and part of Karamuramu Island is visible to the far right.)

== Description ==
The island's land use is primarily pastoral and plantations, but with some areas of native vegetation.

== History ==
The island was purchased from Sir John Logan Campbell by the McCallum family in 1894 (along with the neighbouring, much smaller Karamuramu Island). William Fraser McCallum and his brothers created a partnership in 1904 and quarried red chert on the island from 1906 until 1927, used extensively to create concrete structures in the growing city of Auckland. As a wharf, they sank the first iron ship built in Auckland, the SS Rotomahana.
