= 1979 in New Zealand =

- Decades: 1950s; 1960s; 1970s; 1980s; 1990s
- See also: History of New Zealand; List of years in New Zealand; Timeline of New Zealand history

The following lists events that happened during 1979 in New Zealand.

== Population ==
- Estimated population as of 31 December: 3,163,900.
- Increase since 31 December 1978: -1,300 (−0.04%).
- Males per 100 females: 99.0.

== Incumbents ==
=== Regal and viceregal ===
- Head of State – Elizabeth II
- Governor-General – The Rt Hon. Sir Keith Holyoake KG GCMG CH QSO.

=== Government ===
- Speaker of the House – Richard Harrison.
- Prime Minister – Robert Muldoon
- Deputy Prime Minister – Brian Talboys.
- Minister of Finance – Robert Muldoon.
- Minister of Foreign Affairs – Brian Talboys.
- Attorney-General – Jim McLay.
- Chief Justice — Sir Ronald Davison

=== Parliamentary opposition ===
- Leader of the Opposition – Bill Rowling (Labour).
- Social Credit Party – Bruce Beetham

=== Main centre leaders ===
- Mayor of Auckland – Dove-Myer Robinson
- Mayor of Hamilton – Ross Jansen
- Mayor of Wellington – Michael Fowler
- Mayor of Christchurch – Hamish Hay
- Mayor of Dunedin – Clifford George (Cliff) Skeggs

== Events ==
- 10 January – A fire destroys the Farmers' Co-operative Association department store in Blenheim, aided by strong northwesterly winds and a 33 °C (91 °F) temperature.
- February: Muhammed Ali came to New Zealand; staying at Upper Hutt (photos).
- 17 February – an Air New Zealand Fokker F27 Friendship crashed into Manukau Harbour while on final approach to Auckland Airport 1 crew and 1 company staff member were killed.
- 19 March – Cessna aircraft en route from Palmerston North to Taupo crashed onto the Desert Rd in bad weather, killing all 6 occupants
- 24 May – Labour MP Malcolm Douglas is removed from Parliament six months after the 1978 general election, after an electoral petition by National opponent Winston Peters is upheld over irregularities in the votes of the Hunua electorate. Peters subsequently replaces Douglas
- 30 July – The carless days scheme is introduced, restricting private motor vehicles from driving on one day of the week.
- 8 August – 1979 Abbotsford landslip: Sixty-nine homes in the Dunedin suburb of Abbotsford are left uninhabitable after 18 hectares (44 acres) of land slips 48 metres in 15 minutes.
- 20 September – The New Zealand Federation of Labour holds a 24-hour general strike to protest government intervention in the drivers' award. Around 300,000 workers, mainly in the manufacturing and transport industries, participate in the strike.
- 3 November – The Evening Star ceases publication. The Dunedin newspaper was founded in 1863.
- 28 November – Air New Zealand Flight 901 crashes in Mount Erebus, Antarctica, killing all 237 passengers and 20 crewmembers aboard.
- Two years after its official opening, the new executive wing of Parliament Buildings, known as the Beehive, is completed and occupied by the Government.

== Arts and literature ==
- Michael A. Noonan wins the Robert Burns Fellowship.
- Nambassa beach festival, touring family roadshow. Whangamatā Waihi Beach Mount Maunganui and Coromandel.
- Nambassa three-day music, crafts and alternative lifestyle festival on Phil and Pat Hulses' 400-acre (1.6 km^{2}) farm in Golden Valley, north of Waihi. Attendance 75,000 plus.
- Summer '79, outdoor arts festival in the parks of Wellington – including the Botanical Gardens, the Newtown Zoo, the Town Belt and several suburban parks.

See 1979 in art, 1979 in literature, Category:1979 books

=== Music ===
==== New Zealand Music Awards ====
- ALBUM OF THE YEAR Street Talk – Street Talk
- SINGLE OF THE YEAR Th' Dudes – Be Mine Tonight
- TOP MALE VOCALIST Rob Guest
- TOP FEMALE VOCALIST Sharon O'Neill
- TOP GROUP Th' Dudes
- MOST PROMISING MALE VOCALIST Jon Stevens
- MOST PROMISING FEMALE VOCALIST Tina Cross
- MOST PROMISING GROUP Street Talk
- PRODUCER OF THE YEAR Steve Robinson – This Heart This Song
- ENGINEER OF THE YEAR Gerry Smith – This Heart This Song
- BEST COVER DESIGN Geoff Chunn, Peter Burt & Dale Wrightson – Just Drove Through Town

See: 1979 in music

=== Performing arts ===
- Benny Award presented by the Variety Artists Club of New Zealand to Eddie Hegan and Chic Littlewood.

=== Radio and television ===
- Feltex Television Awards:
  - Best Current Affairs: Dateline Monday
  - Best Documentary: Okarito
  - Best Drama: The Mad Dog Gang Meets Rotten Fred and Ratsguts
  - Best Speciality: Spot On
  - Best Information: Fair Go
  - Best Actor: David McPhail in A Week of It
  - Best Actress: Barbara Ewing in Rachel
  - Entertainer of the Year: David McPhail
  - Special Committee Award: Selwyn Toogood for pioneering work in Radio and Television

See: 1979 in New Zealand television, 1979 in television, List of TVNZ television programming, Category:Television in New Zealand, Category:New Zealand television shows, Public broadcasting in New Zealand

=== Film ===
- Middle Age Spread
- Sons for the Return Home

See: Category:1979 film awards, 1979 in film, List of New Zealand feature films, Cinema of New Zealand, Category:1979 films

== Sport ==
=== Athletics ===
- Tony Good wins his first national title in the men's marathon, clocking 2:18:47.3.

=== Chess ===
- The 86th New Zealand Chess Championship is held in North Shore, and is won by Ortvin Sarapu of Auckland (his 16th title).

=== Horse racing ===
==== Harness racing ====
- New Zealand Trotting Cup: Lord Module
- Auckland Trotting Cup: Sapling

=== Motorsport ===
- A New Zealand team consisting of Larry Ross, Mitch Shirra, Ivan Mauger and Bruce Cribb win the motorcycle Speedway World Team Cup held at White City Stadium in London.

=== Netball ===
- At the 1979 World Netball Tournament, New Zealand, Australia and Trinidad and Tobago shared the title.

=== Soccer ===
- New Zealand National Soccer League won by Mt. Wellington AFC
- The Chatham Cup is won by North Shore United who beat Mount Wellington 2–1 in the final.

== Births ==
- 27 January: Daniel Vettori, cricketer
- 1 February: Peter Fulton, cricketer
- 15 February: Hamish and James Marshall, cricketers
- 28 February: Olivia Baker, weightlifter
- 4 March: Ben Fouhy, canoeist
- 12 March: Ben Sandford, skeleton racer
- 15 March: Kyle Mills, cricketer
- 20 March: Keven Mealamu, rugby union player
- 26 March: Ben Blair, rugby union player
- 12 May (In Nadi, Fiji): Amasio Valence, rugby sevens player
- 15 May (in Samoa): Chris Masoe, rugby union player.
- 8 June: Adine Wilson, netball player.
- 2 July: Michael Papps, cricketer.
- 13 July: Ladyhawke, singer-songwriter
- 30 July: Louise Corcoran, skeleton racer.
- 3 October: Rodney So'oialo, rugby union player
- 8 November: Brad Leonard, cricketer
- 14 November: Carl Hayman, rugby union player
- 20 November: Maree Bowden, netball player
- 3 December: Daniel Bedingfield, pop singer
- Pete Wheeler, artist.

Category:1979 births

== Deaths ==
- October: Marty Johnstone, drug trafficker ('Mr Asia')
- 28 November: Peter Mulgrew, mountaineer (died in Mount Erebus disaster)

Category:1979 deaths

== See also ==
- List of years in New Zealand
- Timeline of New Zealand history
- History of New Zealand
- Military history of New Zealand
- Timeline of the New Zealand environment
- Timeline of New Zealand's links with Antarctica
