= 1975 in New Zealand =

- Decades: 1950s; 1960s; 1970s; 1980s; 1990s
- See also: History of New Zealand; List of years in New Zealand; Timeline of New Zealand history

The following lists events that happened during 1975 in New Zealand.

== Population ==
- Estimated population as of 31 December: 3,143,700.
- Increase since 31 December 1974: 51,800 (1.68%).
- Males per 100 females: 99.5.

== Incumbents ==
=== Regal and viceregal ===
- Head of State – Elizabeth II
- Governor-General – Sir Denis Blundell GCMG GCVO KBE QSO.

=== Government ===
The 37th New Zealand Parliament continued. Government was by a Labour majority of 55 seats to the National Party's 32 seats. At 29 November election, the allocation of seats for the 38th parliament was reversed and the National Party formed the new government on 12 December.

- Speaker of the House – Stan Whitehead.
- Prime Minister – Bill Rowling then Robert Muldoon
- Deputy Prime Minister – Bob Tizard then Brian Talboys.
- Minister of Finance – Bob Tizard then Robert Muldoon.
- Minister of Foreign Affairs – Bill Rowling then Brian Talboys.
- Attorney-General – Martyn Finlay then Peter Wilkinson.
- Chief Justice — Sir Richard Wild

=== Parliamentary opposition ===
- Leader of the Opposition – Robert Muldoon (National) until 12 December, then Bill Rowling (Labour).

=== Main centre leaders ===
- Mayor of Auckland – Dove-Myer Robinson
- Mayor of Hamilton – Mike Minogue
- Mayor of Wellington – Michael Fowler
- Mayor of Christchurch – Hamish Hay
- Mayor of Dunedin – Jim Barnes

== Events ==
- 4 February – American Lynne Cox becomes the first woman to swim across Cook Strait, making the north–south crossing in just over 12 hours.
- 31 May – Disappearance (and presumed death) of 18-year-old Mona Blades.
- 14 September – Māori land march protesting at land loss leaves Te Hāpua.
- 13 October – Māori land march reaches Parliament building in Wellington, Whina Cooper presents a Memorial of Rights to the Prime Minister Bill Rowling and Māori Affairs Minister Matiu Rata.
- 29 November – 1975 general election.
- The Dunedin Longitudinal Study begins, following the health and development of 1037 children born in Dunedin between 1972 and 1973.

== Arts and literature ==
- Witi Ihimaera wins the Robert Burns Fellowship.

See 1975 in art, 1975 in literature

=== Music ===
==== New Zealand Music Awards ====
- ALBUM OF THE YEAR John Hanlon – Higher Trails
- BEST SINGLE / SINGLE OF THE YEAR Rockinghorse – Thru' The Southern Moonlight
- RECORDING ARTIST/ GROUP OF THE YEAR Mark Williams
- BEST NEW ARTIST Space Waltz
- PRODUCER OF THE YEAR Alan Galbraith – Yesterday Was Just The Beginning of My Life
- ENGINEER OF THE YEAR Phil Yule – Higher Trails
- ARRANGER OF THE YEAR Mike Harvey – Higher Trails
- COMPOSER OF THE YEAR John Hanlon – Higher Trails

See: 1975 in music

=== Performing arts ===
- Benny Award presented by the Variety Artists Club of New Zealand to Phillip Warren QSO.

=== Radio and television ===
- On 1 April, the New Zealand Broadcasting Corporation is split into the competing channels Television One and Television Two. Television One begins broadcasting from the new Avalon studio in Lower Hutt.
- 12 May: Close to Home first airs.
- 30 June: Television Two (TV2) starts broadcasting on Monday 30 June. Jennie Goodwin is the first female newsreader in the Commonwealth.
- 5 July: Television Two holds the first Telethon in New Zealand.
- Feltex Television Awards:
  - Best Documentary: Show on New Guinea's coming independence
  - First Series Awards: Country Calendar
  - Best Performer: Joe Cot'e
  - Best Actor in TV Drama: Ian Mune as Derek
  - Writing: Michael Noonan in Longest Winter and Michael King in Tangata Whenua

See: 1975 in New Zealand television, 1975 in television, List of TVNZ television programming, Category:Television in New Zealand, Category:New Zealand television shows, Public broadcasting in New Zealand

=== Film ===
- Test Pictures

See: Category:1975 film awards, 1975 in film, List of New Zealand feature films, Cinema of New Zealand, Category:1975 films

== Sport ==
=== Athletics ===
- Anthony Reavley wins his first national title in the men's marathon, clocking 2:19:54.6 on 1 March in Dunedin.

=== Chess ===
- The 82nd National Chess Championship is held in Dunedin, and is won by Paul Garbett of Auckland (his second title).

=== Horse racing ===
==== Harness racing ====
- New Zealand Trotting Cup: Lunar Chance
- Auckland Trotting Cup: Captain Harcourt

=== Netball ===
- Auckland hosted the 1975 World Netball Tournament. Australia won the tournament, England finished second and New Zealand finished third.

=== Soccer ===
- New Zealand National Soccer League won by Christchurch United
- The Chatham Cup is won by Christchurch United who beat Blockhouse Bay 4—2 (after extra time) in the final.

== Births ==
- 1 January: Skippy Hamahona, field hockey player.
- 2 January: Reuben Thorne, rugby player.
- 4 January: Bevan Hari, field hockey striker .
- 5 January: Kylie Bax, model.
- 17 January: Tony Brown, rugby player.
- 3 February: Brad Thorn, rugby league and union player.
- 2 March: Daryl Gibson, rugby player.
- 27 March: Andrew Blowers, rugby player.
- 21 April: Danyon Loader, swimmer.
- 2 May: Murray Burdan, swimmer.
- 12 May: Jonah Lomu, rugby player.
- 15 May: Danny Hay, soccer player.
- 7 June: Shane Bond, cricketer.
- 20 June: Takutai Tarsh Kemp, politician. (d. 2025)
- 10 July: Scott Styris, cricketer.
- 17 July: Andre Adams, cricketer.
- 20 July: Greg Feek, rugby player.
- 7 August: Jason Suttie, kickboxer.
- 11 August: Rua Tipoki, rugby player.
- 16 August: Taika Waititi, filmmaker and actor
- 21 August: Mark Robinson, rugby player.
- 21 August: Scott Robertson, rugby player.
- 23 August: Sean Marks, basketballer.
- 27 August: Caryn Paewai, field hockey player.
- 31 August: Craig Cumming, cricketer.
- 9 September: Anton Oliver, rugby player.
- 12 September: Belinda Colling, netball player.
- 2 October: Mark Porter, V8 Supercar driver.
- 14 October: Carlos Spencer, rugby player.
- 23 October: Temepara George, netball player.
- 9 November (in Australia): Mathew Sinclair, cricketer.
- 14 December: Lisa Walton, field hockey player
- (in Britain): Toa Fraser, playwright.
- Levi Hawken, skateboarder and artist.
- Nikki Jenkins, gymnast
- Craig McNair, politician.
- Chong Nee, musician.

Category:1975 births

== Deaths ==
- 6 February: Air Chief Marshal Sir Keith Park, senior RAF commander (b. 1892)
- 13 July: Cecil King, rugby league footballer. (b. 1888)
- A.H. Reed, publisher and writer (b. 1875)
- Philip Skoglund, politician. (b. 1899)

== See also ==
- List of years in New Zealand
- Timeline of New Zealand history
- History of New Zealand
- Military history of New Zealand
- Timeline of the New Zealand environment
- Timeline of New Zealand's links with Antarctica
