= 1970 in New Zealand =

- Decades: 1950s; 1960s; 1970s; 1980s; 1990s
- See also: History of New Zealand; List of years in New Zealand; Timeline of New Zealand history

The following lists events that happened during 1970 in New Zealand.

== Population ==
- Estimated population as of 31 December: 2,852,100.
- Increase since 31 December 1969: 48,100 (1.72%).
- Males per 100 females: 99.9.

== Incumbents ==
=== Regal and viceregal ===
- Head of State – Elizabeth II
- Governor-General – Sir Arthur Porritt Bt GCMG GCVO CBE.

=== Government ===
The 36th Parliament of New Zealand commenced, with the second National government in power.

- Speaker of the House – Roy Jack.
- Prime Minister – Keith Holyoake
- Deputy Prime Minister – Jack Marshall.
- Minister of Finance – Robert Muldoon.
- Minister of Foreign Affairs – Keith Holyoake.
- Attorney-General – Jack Marshall.
- Chief Justice — Sir Richard Wild

=== Parliamentary opposition ===
- Leader of the Opposition – Norman Kirk (Labour).

=== Main centre leaders ===
- Mayor of Auckland – Dove-Myer Robinson
- Mayor of Hamilton – Mike Minogue
- Mayor of Wellington – Frank Kitts
- Mayor of Christchurch – Ron Guthrey
- Mayor of Dunedin – Jim Barnes

== Events ==
- 15 January – Police and anti-Vietnam War protestors clash outside the Intercontinental Hotel in Auckland, where visiting U.S. Vice-president Spiro Agnew is staying.
- March – Queen Elizabeth II, Prince Philip, Prince Charles and Princess Anne tour
- 20 July – Christchurch is awarded the hosting rights to the 1974 British Commonwealth Games.
- The North Island natural gas network is commissioned following the completion of the Kapuni gas treatment plant. Natural gas is initially available in Auckland, Hamilton, New Plymouth, Hawera, Wanganui, Palmerston North, Levin and Wellington.

== Arts and literature ==
- Edward Middleton wins the Robert Burns Fellowship.

See 1970 in art, 1970 in literature, Category:1970 books

=== Music ===
==== New Zealand Music Awards ====
The winners in the New Zealand Music Awards were

- Loxene Golden Disc Soloist Award: Craig Scott – "Let's Get A Little Sentimental"
- Loxene Golden Disc Group Award: Hogsnort Rupert – "Pretty Girl"

See: 1970 in music

=== Performing arts ===
- Benny Award presented by the Variety Artists Club of New Zealand to Howard Morrison and Oswald Astley Cheesman.

=== Radio and Television ===
- The Feltex Television Awards begin.
  - Best Arts: Green Gin Sunset
  - Best Light Entertainment: The Alpha Plan
  - Public Affairs: Gallery for Brian Edwards' interview with Christiaan Barnard.
  - Best Documentary: Three Score Years and Then
  - Professional (TVPDA award): David Gardner
- Radio Hauraki granted the first commercial licence in New Zealand breaking the government monopoly of the radio airwaves.

See: 1970 in New Zealand television, 1970 in television, List of TVNZ television programming, Category:Television in New Zealand, Category:New Zealand television shows, Public broadcasting in New Zealand

=== Film ===
See: Category:1970 film awards, 1970 in film, List of New Zealand feature films, Cinema of New Zealand, Category:1970 films

== Sport ==
See: 1970 in sports, Category:1970 in sports ,

=== Athletics ===
- Jeff Julian wins his fourth national title in the men's marathon, clocking 2:24:32 on 7 March in Napier.

=== British Commonwealth Games ===
Gold	Silver	Bronze	Total
2	6	6	14

=== Chess ===
- The 77th National Chess Championship is held in Auckland, and is won by Ortvin Sarapu of Auckland (his 11th title).

=== Horse racing ===
==== Harness racing ====
- New Zealand Trotting Cup: James
- Auckland Trotting Cup: Stella Frost

=== Shooting ===
- Ballinger Belt – Maurie Gordon (Okawa)

=== Soccer ===
- Establishment of the New Zealand National Soccer League
- Blockhouse Bay are the first National Soccer Champions.
- The Chatham Cup is won by Blockhouse Bay, who beat Western Suburbs FC (Wellington) 3–2 in a replay after the final ended at 2–2 after extra time.
- Northern League premier division (Thompson Shield) – Mount Albert
- Central League first division – Waterside
- Southern League first division – Christchurch Technical
- Promoted to NSL for 1971: Mount Albert-Ponsonby (following a merger) and Caversham (runners up in Southern League, as Christchurch Technical were connected to Christchurch United).

== Births ==
- 10 January: Katherine Dienes, organist and composer
- 12 January: Brett Leaver, field hockey player
- 13 February: Metiria Turei, politician
- 25 March: Jason Wells, cricketer
- 8 April: Catherine Chidgey, novelist
- 4 May: Paul Wiseman, cricketer
- 12 May: Katrina Shanks, politician
- 20 May: David Smail, golfer
- 13 June: Chris Cairns, cricketer
- 20 June: Maia Lewis, cricketer
- 19 July: Christopher Luxon, politician
- 9 August: Deborah Morris, politician
- 13 August: Glenn Jonas, cricketer
- 21 August: Nanaia Mahuta, politician
- 7 September: Guy Callaghan, butterfly swimmer
- 22 September: Hitro Okesene, rugby league player
- 5 October: Cal Wilson, comedian and broadcaster (d. 2023)
- 19 October: Whetu Taewa, rugby league player
- 27 October (in Samoa): Alama Ieremia, rugby player
- 5 November: Andrew Hastie, field hockey player
- 3 December: Karen Smith, field hockey player
- 5 December:
  - Matthew Horne, cricketer
  - Simon Power, politician
- 26 December: Danielle Cormack, actress
- Nicola Kawana, actress

== Deaths ==
- 27 January: Rita Angus, painter.
- 28 February: Brian Hewat, politician.
- 2 June: Bruce McLaren, racing driver and car designer.
- 24 June: Tiaki Omana, politician.
- 1 October: Reginald Bedford Hammond, surveyor, architect, town planner and senior public servant
- Philip Connolly, politician.
- Sir Charles Cotton, geologist.
- Hon. Jack Watts, politician.

Category:1970 deaths

== See also ==
- List of years in New Zealand
- Timeline of New Zealand history
- History of New Zealand
- Military history of New Zealand
- Timeline of the New Zealand environment
- Timeline of New Zealand's links with Antarctica

For world events and topics in 1970 not specifically related to New Zealand see: 1970
