= 1969 in New Zealand =

- Decades: 1940s; 1950s; 1960s; 1970s; 1980s
- See also: History of New Zealand; List of years in New Zealand; Timeline of New Zealand history

The following lists events that happened during 1969 in New Zealand.

== Population ==
- Estimated population as of 31 December: 2,804,000.
- Increase since 31 December 1968: 31,000 (1.12%).
- Males per 100 females: 99.7.

== Incumbents ==
=== Regal and viceregal ===
- Head of State – Elizabeth II
- Governor-General – Sir Arthur Porritt Bt GCMG GCVO CBE.

=== Government ===
The 35th parliament concluded and a general election was held on 26 November. It saw the Second National Government of New Zealand returned for a fourth term, with 45 of the 84 seats. The Social Credit Party lost its only seat. The overall vote was very close, with National only 1% ahead of Labour in total votes cast.

- Speaker of the House – Roy Jack .
- Prime Minister – Keith Holyoake
- Deputy Prime Minister – Jack Marshall.
- Minister of Finance – Robert Muldoon.
- Minister of Foreign Affairs – Keith Holyoake.
- Attorney-General – Ralph Hanan until 24 July, then vacant until Jack Marshall appointed on 22 December.
- Chief Justice — Sir Richard Wild

=== Parliamentary opposition ===
- Leader of the Opposition – Norman Kirk (Labour).
- Leader of the Social Credit Party – Vernon Cracknell until 26 November

=== Main centre leaders ===
- Mayor of Auckland – Dove-Myer Robinson
- Mayor of Hamilton – Mike Minogue
- Mayor of Wellington – Frank Kitts
- Mayor of Christchurch – Ron Guthrey
- Mayor of Dunedin – Jim Barnes

== Events ==
- The voting age is lowered from 21 to 20.
- A law change allows the number of seats in Parliament to increase in order to preserve the number of South Island seats. This increases the number of MPs from 80 to 84.
- The trading banks computerise cheque handling and money transfer between banks with overnight processing, between February and November, see Databank Systems Limited.
- The Maui gas field was discovered, 35 km off the coast of Taranaki.
- The Save Manapouri campaign was launched at a public meeting in Invercargill in October.
- The Auckland Harbour Bridge was widened from 4 to 8 lanes.
- Blood and breath alcohol limits introduced for drivers.
- 6 November – Coastlands Shopping Centre opens for the first time.

== Arts and literature ==
- Warren Dibble wins the Robert Burns Fellowship.

See 1969 in art, 1969 in literature

=== Music ===
==== New Zealand Music Awards ====
Loxene Golden Disc Shane – Saint Paul

See: 1969 in music

=== Radio and television ===
- Coverage of the Apollo 11 Moon landing on videotape was flown from Sydney to Wellington by the Royal New Zealand Air Force, and a microwave link was put together to allow its simultaneous broadcast throughout the country.
- 5 November: the first Network News bulletin was read at 7.35 pm by Dougal Stevenson and received simultaneously around the country

See: 1969 in New Zealand television, 1969 in television, List of TVNZ television programming, Public broadcasting in New Zealand Category:Television in New Zealand, Category:New Zealand television shows.

=== Film ===
See: Category:1969 film awards, 1969 in film, List of New Zealand feature films, Cinema of New Zealand, Category:1969 films

=== Performing arts ===
- Grand Master of Magic Award established and presented to Edgar (The Great) Benyon.
- Benny Award established by the Variety Artists Club of New Zealand and presented to Edgar (The Great) Benyon.

== Sport ==
=== Athletics ===
- Track events within New Zealand switch from imperial to metric distances. Field events would switch later in 1972.
- Jeff Julian wins his third national title in the men's marathon, clocking 2:19:07.6 on 8 March in Christchurch.

=== Chess ===
- The 76th National Chess Championship is held in Wellington, and the title is shared by B.R. Anderson of Christchurch and Ortvin Sarapu of Auckland.

=== Horse racing ===
==== Harness racing ====
- New Zealand Trotting Cup: Spry
- Auckland Trotting Cup: Leading Light

=== Shooting ===
- Ballinger Belt – Ian Ballinger (Sydenham)

=== Soccer ===
- The Chatham Cup is won by Eastern Suburbs who beat New Brighton 2–0 in the final.
- Teams in the Northern and Central leagues were playing for places in the planned 1970 National league, with the top three in each league being promoted. The Southern League would be represented by Christchurch United, a new club backed by Christchurch City, Shamrock, Rangers and Christchurch Technical, who would continue to play independently in the Southern League.
- Northern League premier division (Thompson Shield) won by Mt Wellington.
- Central League won by Western Suburbs FC
- Southern League First Division won by Christchurch Technical

== Births ==
- 5 January: David Dixon, American football player
- 20 January: Blair Larsen, rugby player
- 27 January: Shane Thomson, cricketer
- 23 February: Michael Campbell, golfer
- 24 April: Tony Tuimavave, rugby league player
- 3 May: Chris Zoricich, soccer player
- 25 June: Liza Hunter-Galvan, long-distance runner
- 3 July (in Florida, USA): Leonard King, basketball player
- 26 July: Tony Tatupu, rugby league player
- 27 July: Brendon Pongia, basketballer and television presenter
- 6 August: Simon Doull, cricketer
- 6 September: Doug Pirini, decathlete
- 9 September: Rachel Hunter, model
- 10 September: Craig Innes, rugby footballer
- 6 October: Kirsten Smith, javelin thrower
- 10 October: Scott Nelson, race walker
- 13 October: Hugh McCutcheon, volleyball player and coach
- 11 November: Michael Owens, cricketer
- 20 November: Chris Harris, cricketer
- 5 December (in Maine, USA): Eric Saindon, visual effects supervisor (film)

== Deaths ==
- 9 January: Brigadier General Leslie Andrew, VC, DSO, soldier.
- 22 January: Sir Matthew Oram, politician and 13th Speaker of the House of Representatives.
- 8 May: Sir Sydney Smith, forensic expert.
- 15 June: Frank Langstone, politician.
- 24 July: Ralph Hanan, politician.
- 21 September: William Denham, politician.
- 23 October: Janie Searle, Salvation Army officer and community leader.

Category:1969 deaths

== See also ==
- List of years in New Zealand
- Timeline of New Zealand history
- History of New Zealand
- Military history of New Zealand
- Timeline of the New Zealand environment
- Timeline of New Zealand's links with Antarctica
