= 1976 in New Zealand =

- Decades: 1950s; 1960s; 1970s; 1980s; 1990s
- See also: History of New Zealand; List of years in New Zealand; Timeline of New Zealand history

The following lists events that happened during 1976 in New Zealand.

== Population ==
- Estimated population as of 31 December: 3,163,400.
- Increase since 31 December 1975: 19,700 (0.63%).
- Males per 100 females: 99.5.

== Incumbents ==
=== Regal and viceregal ===
- Head of State – Elizabeth II
- Governor-General – Sir Denis Blundell GCMG GCVO KBE QSO.

=== Government ===
- Speaker of the House – Roy Jack.
- Prime Minister – Robert Muldoon
- Deputy Prime Minister – Brian Talboys.
- Minister of Finance – Robert Muldoon.
- Minister of Foreign Affairs – Brian Talboys.
- Attorney-General – Peter Wilkinson.
- Chief Justice — Sir Richard Wild

=== Parliamentary opposition ===
- Leader of the Opposition – Bill Rowling (Labour).

=== Main centre leaders ===
- Mayor of Auckland – Dove-Myer Robinson
- Mayor of Hamilton – Mike Minogue then Bruce Beetham
- Mayor of Wellington – Michael Fowler
- Mayor of Christchurch – Hamish Hay
- Mayor of Dunedin – Jim Barnes

== Events ==
- 28 February – Nelson by-election – Mel Courtney (Labour) elected to replace the late Stan Whitehead.
- 1 April – The New Zealand Fire Service is formed, following the nationwide merger of urban fire boards and fire brigades brought about by the Fire Service Act 1975.
- 9 April – Upper Hutt becomes the first telephone exchange to implement subscriber toll dialling, allowing national calls to be made without operator assistance.
- 7 June – The nation's first McDonald's restaurant opens in central Porirua; a Big Mac initially cost 75c.
- 17 July – 1 August – New Zealand competes at the 1976 Summer Olympics in Montreal, Quebec, Canada, despite 28 African nations boycotting the games over New Zealand's sporting ties with apartheid South Africa. The nation wins four medals: two gold, one silver and one bronze.
- 15 September – The Union Company's Lyttelton to Wellington ferry service is cancelled, having operated since 1895 and by the Ministry of Transport since 1974, facing increased competition from air travel and the Railways' Cook Strait ferry service.
- 1 November – The Waitangi Day Act 1976 commences, replacing the New Zealand Day public holiday with Waitangi Day on 6 February.
- 14 December – The Weights and Measures Amendment Act commences, officially completing metrication in New Zealand.

== Arts and literature ==
- Sam Hunt wins the Robert Burns Fellowship.

See 1976 in art, 1976 in literature

=== Music ===
==== New Zealand Music Awards ====
- ALBUM OF THE YEAR NZSO – Symphony No. 2
- RECORDING ARTIST/GROUP OF THE YEAR Dr Tree
- BEST NEW ARTIST Dr Tree
- PRODUCER OF THE YEAR Alan Galbraith – Taking It All in Stride
- ENGINEER OF THE YEAR Peter Hitchcock – Taking It All in Stride
- ARRANGER OF THE YEAR David Frazer – Taking It All in Stride
- COMPOSER OF THE YEAR John Hanlon – Night Life

See: 1976 in music

=== Performing arts ===
- Benny Award presented by the Variety Artists Club of New Zealand to Merv Smith and Rusty Greaves.

=== Radio and television ===
- Television Two is renamed South Pacific Television.
- All broadcasting services, including radio, are merged into the Broadcasting Corporation of New Zealand.
- 17–18 July: A power failure affecting the Blue Duck microwave station near Kaikoura causes both the TV One and TV Two networks to split into two. Most of the South Island misses the live opening ceremony of the 1976 Summer Olympics as a result.
- Feltex Television Awards:
  - Best Programme: Richard Pearse
  - Best Personality: John Clarke and Dougal Stevenson
  - Actor: Martyn Sanderson
  - Actress: Ilona Rodgers
  - Best Series: One Man's View
  - Best Script: Ian Mune and Peter Hansard: Winners And Losers: The Woman at the Store

See: 1976 in New Zealand television, 1976 in television, List of TVNZ television programming, Category:Television in New Zealand, Category:New Zealand television shows, Public broadcasting in New Zealand

=== Film ===
- The God Boy

See: Category:1976 film awards, 1976 in film, List of New Zealand feature films, Cinema of New Zealand, Category:1976 films

== Sport ==
=== Athletics ===
- UK-born Jack Foster wins his first national title in the men's marathon, clocking 2:16:27 on 6 March in Auckland.

=== Chess ===
- The 83rd National Chess Championship is held in Upper Hutt. There is a three-way tie for the title between Lev Aptekar, Murray Chandler, and Ortvin Sarapu .

=== Horse racing ===
==== Harness racing ====
- New Zealand Trotting Cup: Stanley Rio
- Auckland Trotting Cup: Bolton Byrd

=== Olympic Games ===
==== Summer Olympics ====
Gold	Silver	Bronze	Total
2	1	1	4

- New Zealand sends a team of 80 competitors.

==== Winter Olympics ====
Gold	Silver	Bronze	Total
0	0	0	0

- New Zealand sends a team of five alpine skiers.

=== Paralympic Games ===
==== Summer Paralympics ====
- New Zealand sends a team of 12 competitors.

Gold	Silver	Bronze	Total
7	1	5	12

=== Soccer ===
- New Zealand National Soccer League won by Wellington Diamond United
- The Chatham Cup is won by Christchurch United who beat Eastern Suburbs (Auckland) 4–0 in the final.

== Births ==
- 1 January – Karl Burnett, actor
- 13 January – Bic Runga, singer, songwriter
- 12 February – Christian Cullen, rugby union footballer
- 14 March – Sarah Ulmer, cyclist
- 31 March – Anna Rowberry, netball player
- 6 April – Bruce Reihana, rugby player
- 10 April – Jason Richards, motor racing driver (d. 2011)
- 7 May – Stacey Jones, rugby league footballer
- 14 May – Jason Reeves, broadcaster
- 3 June – Miriama Smith, actress
- 8 June – Grant Donaldson, cricketer
- 7 July – Ron Cribb, rugby union footballer
- 3 August – Rachel Sutherland, field hockey player
- 3 September – Ivan Vicelich, soccer player
- 13 September – Craig McMillan, cricketer
- 3 October – Simon Wills, motor racing driver
- 15 October – Jason Kerrison, singer-songwriter from the band Opshop
- 4 November – Troy Flavell, rugby union footballer
- 20 November – Doug Viney, K-1 fighter
- 3 December – Byron Kelleher, rugby union footballer
- 13 December – Mark Paston, soccer player
- 15 December – Joseph Yovich, cricketer
- 21 December – Mark Dickel, basketball player

Category:1976 births

== Deaths ==
- 9 January: Sir Stanley Whitehead, politician and 15th Speaker of the House of Representatives.
- 7 February (in Australia): Sir Cedric Stanton Hicks, nutrition scientist.
- 12 June: Herb Lilburne, All Black captain.
- 15 July: Peter Gilbert, boxer.
- 20 July: Tom Lowry, cricketer.
- 19 August: Ken Wadsworth, cricketer.
- 21 August: Ken James, cricketer.
- 12 November: Cliff Porter, All Black captain.
- 14 November: Ernest Toop, politician, deputy mayor of Wellington

== See also ==
- List of years in New Zealand
- Timeline of New Zealand history
- History of New Zealand
- Military history of New Zealand
- Timeline of the New Zealand environment
- Timeline of New Zealand's links with Antarctica
