= 1977 in New Zealand =

- Decades: 1950s; 1960s; 1970s; 1980s; 1990s
- See also: History of New Zealand; List of years in New Zealand; Timeline of New Zealand history

The following lists events that happened during 1977 in New Zealand.

== Population ==
- Estimated population as of 31 December: 3,166,400.
- Increase since 31 December 1976: 3000 (0.09%).
- Males per 100 females: 99.4.

== Incumbents ==
=== Regal and viceregal ===
- Head of State – Elizabeth II
- Governor-General – Sir Denis Blundell GCMG GCVO KBE QSO, followed by The Rt Hon. Sir Keith Holyoake KG GCMG CH QSO.

=== Government ===
1977 was the second full year of the 38th Parliament. The Third National Government was in power.

- Speaker of the House – Roy Jack.
- Prime Minister – Robert Muldoon
- Deputy Prime Minister – Brian Talboys.
- Minister of Finance – Robert Muldoon.
- Minister of Foreign Affairs – Brian Talboys.
- Attorney-General – Peter Wilkinson.
- Chief Justice — Sir Richard Wild

=== Parliamentary opposition ===
- Leader of the Opposition – Bill Rowling (Labour).

=== Main centre leaders ===
- Mayor of Auckland – Dove-Myer Robinson
- Mayor of Hamilton – Bruce Beetham then Ross Jansen
- Mayor of Wellington – Michael Fowler
- Mayor of Christchurch – Hamish Hay
- Mayor of Dunedin – Jim Barnes then Clifford George (Cliff) Skeggs

== Events ==
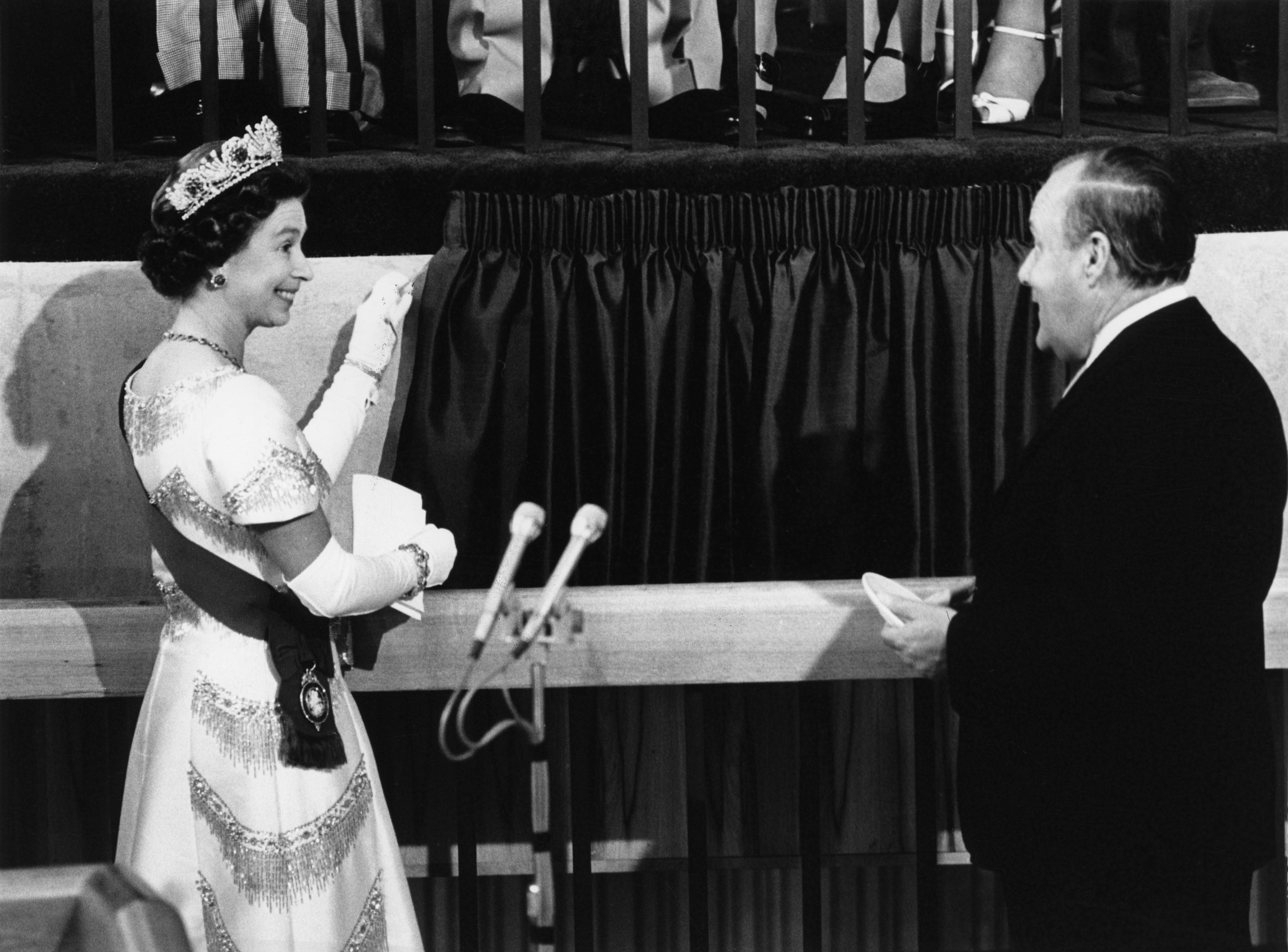
28 February: Queen Elizabeth II officially opens the Beehive.

- 5 January – Led by Joe Hawke, members of Ngati Whatua occupy Bastion Point reserve (Takaparawha) to protest crown sales of land taken from Māori.
- 6 February – Silver Jubilee of Elizabeth II's accession as Queen of New Zealand
- 28 February – The new Executive Wing of the New Zealand Parliament, nicknamed the "Beehive" due to its shape, is officially opened by Queen Elizabeth II, despite not being fully complete yet.
- 26 March – 1977 Mangere by-election: David Lange (Labour) is elected to replace Colin Moyle.
- 21 November – God Defend New Zealand becomes the second official national anthem of New Zealand, in conjunction with God Save The Queen.
- 6 December – The meat pie-based fast food chain Georgie Pie opens its first restaurant in Kelston, Auckland.
- 23 December – the Wild Animal Control Act 1977 passed into law
- New Zealand proclaims an Exclusive Economic Zone of 200 nautical miles (370 km) – the seventh largest in the world at 4.3 million km^{2}
- Mushrooms and typewriters are added to the CPI basket.

== Arts and literature ==
- Keri Hulme and Roger Hall win the Robert Burns Fellowship.

See 1977 in art, 1977 in literature

=== Music ===
The New Zealand Music Awards were not held this year.

- Waikino music festival at Bicknel's farm, Waitawheta Valley, between Waihi and Waikino. Attendance 5500.

See: 1977 in music

=== Radio and television ===
- April: Fair Go airs for the first time.
- June: Wellington's Radio Active 89FM first hits the airwaves
- Feltex Television Awards:
  - Best Current Affairs: News at Ten
  - Best Documentary Series: Black Future
  - Best Light Entertainment: Blerta
  - Best Play: The God Boy
  - Best Drama: Moynihan
  - Best Speciality: Country Calendar
  - Best Actor: Ian Mune in Winners and Losers and Moynihan
  - Best Actress: Judie Douglass in The God Boy
  - Best Script: The God Boy
  - Best Personality: Roger Gascoigne

=== Performing arts ===
- Benny Award presented by the Variety Artists Club of New Zealand to Max Cryer.
- Roger Hall's Middle-Age Spread premiered at the Circa Theatre, Wellington

=== Television ===
See: 1977 in New Zealand television, 1977 in television, List of TVNZ television programming, Category:Television in New Zealand, Category:New Zealand television shows, Public broadcasting in New Zealand

=== Film ===
- Landfall
- Off the Edge
- Sleeping Dogs
- Solo
- Wild Man

See: Category:1977 film awards, 1977 in film, List of New Zealand feature films, Cinema of New Zealand, Category:1977 films

== Sport ==
=== Athletics ===
- Terry Manners wins his second national title in the men's marathon, clocking 2:20:40 in Hāwera.

=== Association football ===
- New Zealand National Soccer League won by North Shore United
- The Chatham Cup is won by Nelson United who beat Mount Wellington 1–0 in the final.

=== Chess ===
- The 84th New Zealand Chess Championship is held in North Shore, and is won by Ortvin Sarapu of Auckland.

=== Horse racing ===
==== Harness racing ====
- New Zealand Trotting Cup: Sole Command
- There was no 1977 running of the Auckland Trotting Cup as the race was being rescheduled from December (1976) to February (1978)

== Births ==
- 22 January: Jono Gibbes, rugby player
- 25 February: Matthew Bell, cricketer
- 25 March: Brooke Walker, cricketer
- 16 May: Melanie Lynskey, actress
- 20 May: Raf de Gregorio, soccer player
- 25 May: Michael Bevin, field hockey goalkeeper
- 14 June: Duncan Oughton, footballer
- 9 July (in South Africa): Leana du Plooy, netball player'
- 5 July: Dale Rasmussen, rugby player
- 11 July: Matai Smith, television presenter
- 13 July: Xavier Rush, rugby player
- 5 September: Emily Gillam, field hockey player
- 8 September: Sheryl Scanlan, netball player
- 9 September: Caleb Ralph, rugby player
- 18 October: Ryan Nelsen, footballer
- 13 November: Chanel Cole, musician
- 28 November: Greg Somerville, rugby player
- 15 December: Dominic Bowden, television presenter
- 21 December: Leon MacDonald, rugby player

Category:1977 births

== Deaths ==
- 22 January: Toby Hill, watersider and trade unionist
- 18 February: Ron Jarden, rugby player.
- 7 June (in England): Sir Rex Nan Kivell, art collector.
- 26 June; Alice May Palmer, public servant and union official
- 15 August: Margaret Escott, novelist and poet.
- 24 December: Sir Roy Jack, politician and 16th Speaker of the House of Representatives.

== See also ==
- List of years in New Zealand
- Timeline of New Zealand history
- History of New Zealand
- Military history of New Zealand
- Timeline of the New Zealand environment
- Timeline of New Zealand's links with Antarctica
