= 1973 in New Zealand =

- Decades: 1950s; 1960s; 1970s; 1980s; 1990s
- See also: History of New Zealand; List of years in New Zealand; Timeline of New Zealand history

The following lists events that happened during 1973 in New Zealand.

== Population ==
- Estimated population as of 31 December 1973: 3,024,900.
- Increase since 31 December 1972 – 65,200 (2.20%).
- Males per 100 females – 99.7.
- It took 21 years for the population to grow from 2 million to 3 million.

== Incumbents ==
=== Regal and viceregal ===
- Head of State – Elizabeth II
- Governor-General – Denis Blundell
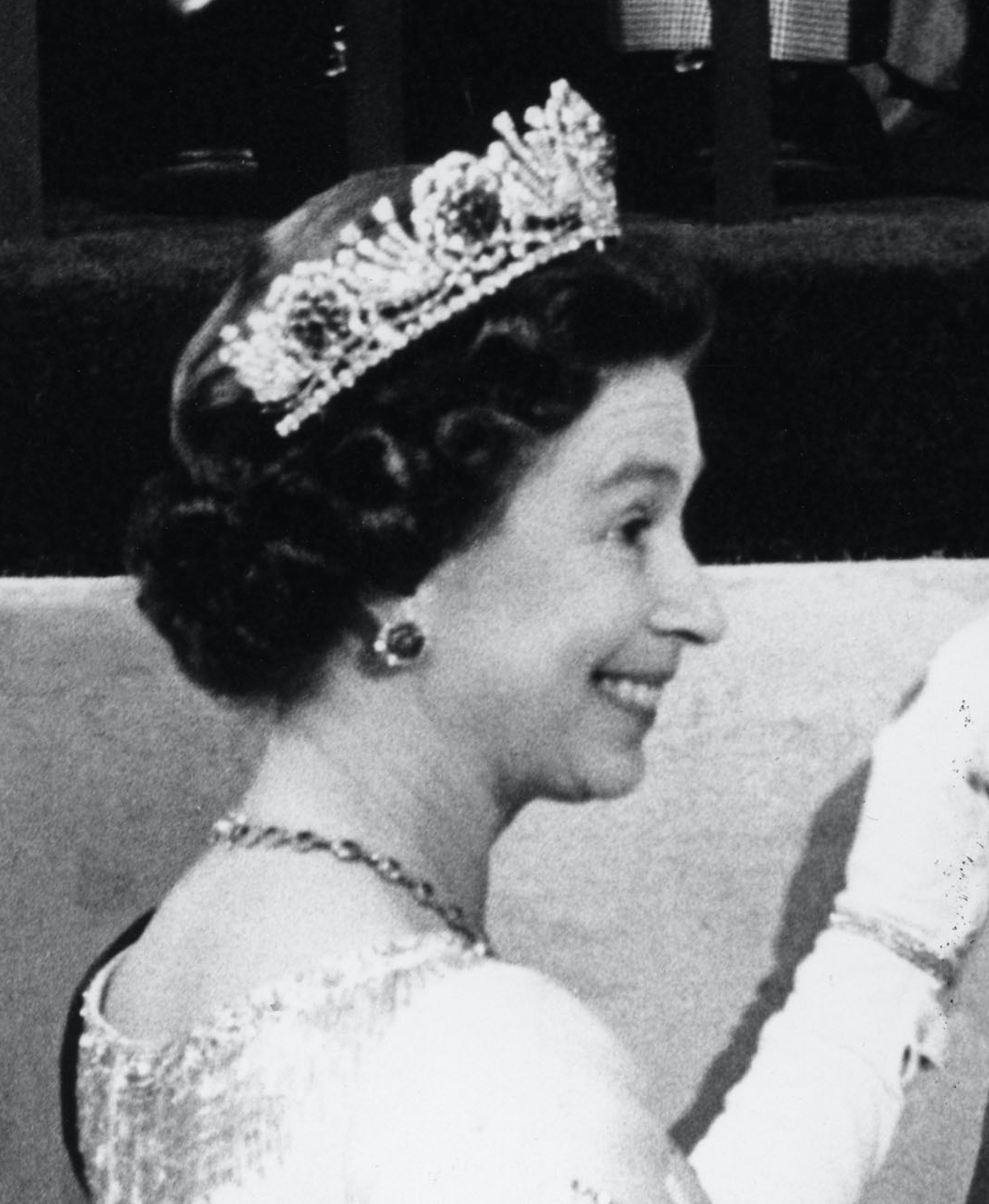
Elizabeth II

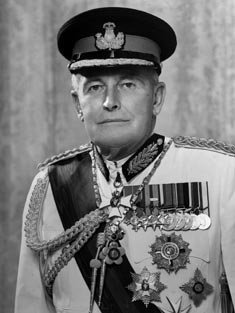
Denis Blundell

=== Government ===
The 37th New Zealand Parliament commences. Government is by a Labour majority of 55 seats to the National Party's 32 seats.

- Speaker of the House – Stan Whitehead
- Prime Minister – Norman Kirk
- Deputy Prime Minister – Hugh Watt
- Minister of Finance – Bill Rowling
- Minister of Foreign Affairs – Norman Kirk
- Attorney-General – Martyn Finlay
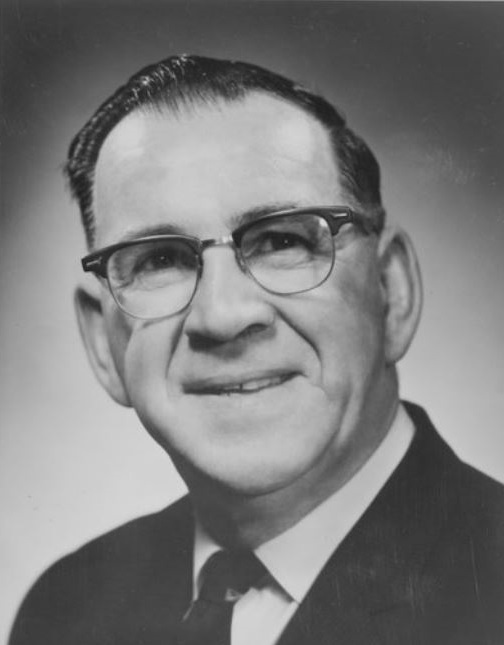
Stanley Whitehead

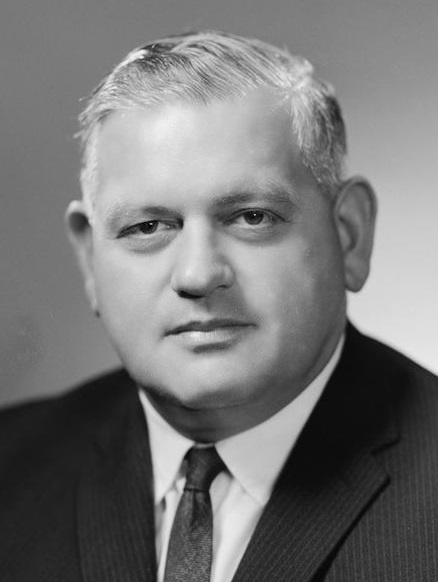
Norman Kirk

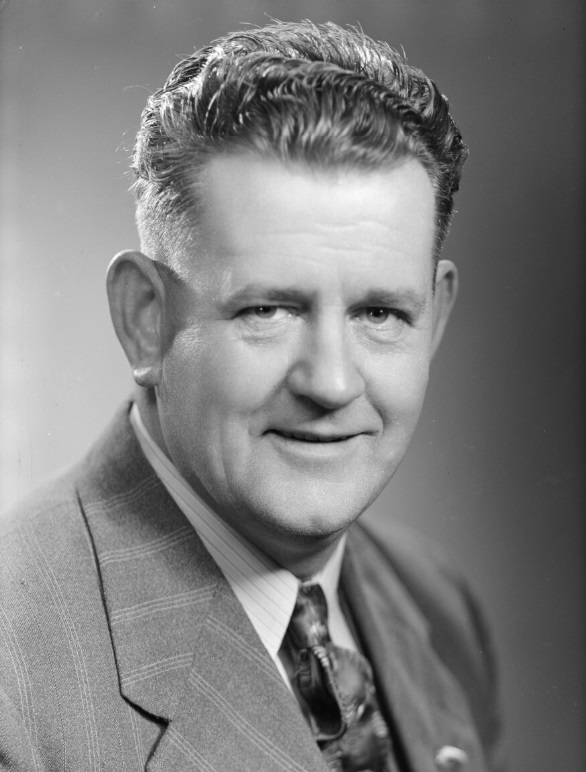
Hugh Watt

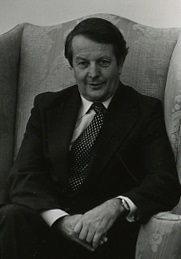
Bill Rowling

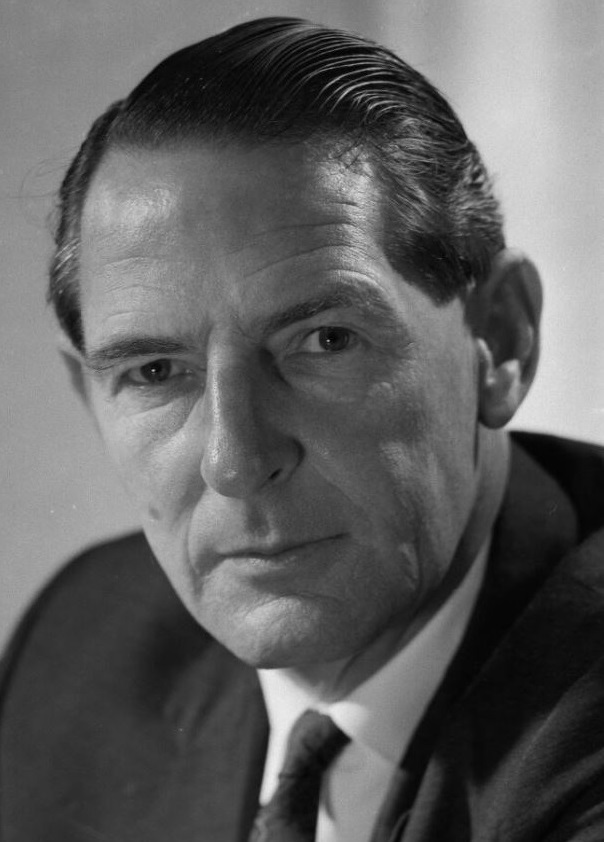
Martyn Finlay

=== Parliamentary opposition ===
- Leader of the Opposition – Jack Marshall (National)
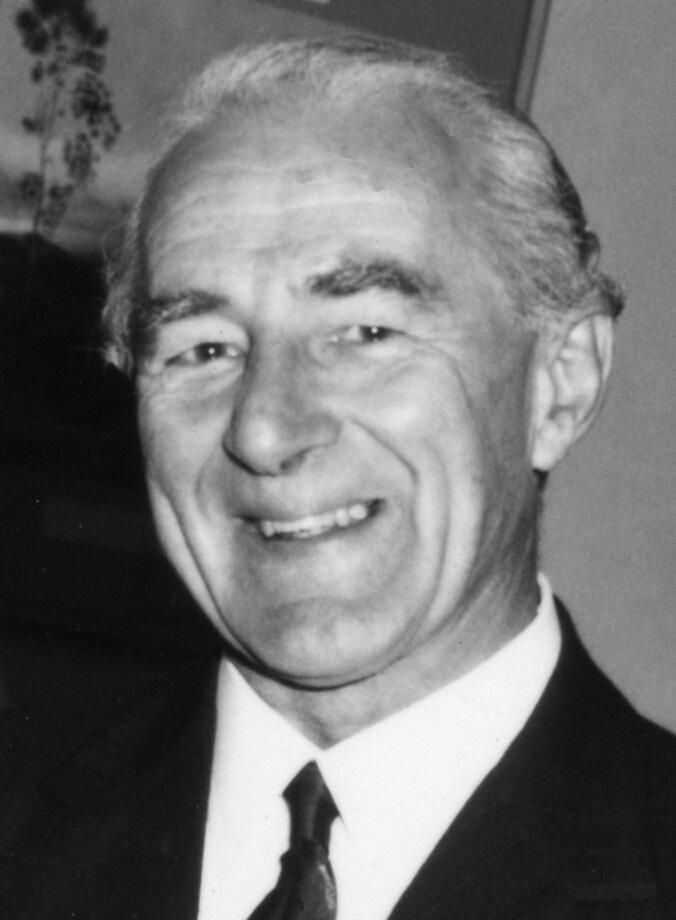
Jack Marshall

=== Judiciary ===
- Chief Justice — Richard Wild

=== Main centre leaders ===
- Mayor of Auckland – Dove-Myer Robinson
- Mayor of Hamilton – Mike Minogue
- Mayor of Wellington – Frank Kitts
- Mayor of Christchurch – Neville Pickering
- Mayor of Dunedin – Jim Barnes
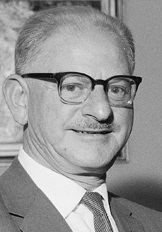
Dove-Myer Robinson

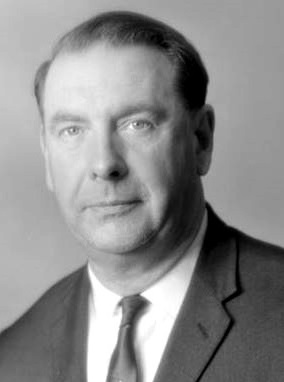
Frank Kitts

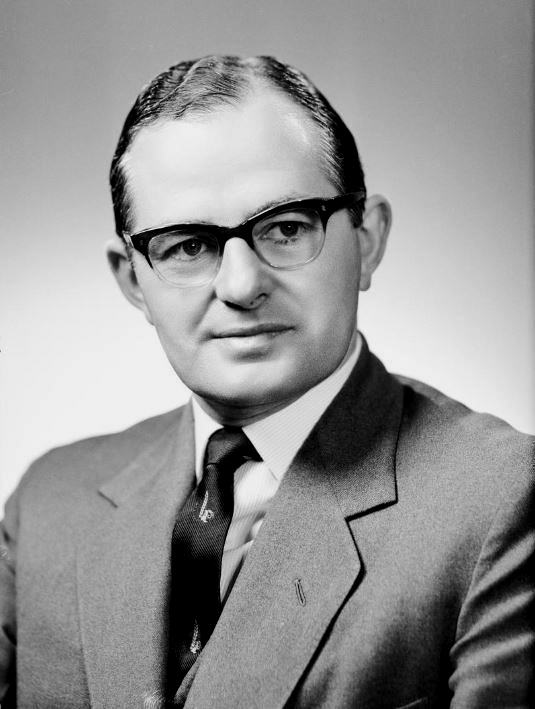
Neville Pickering

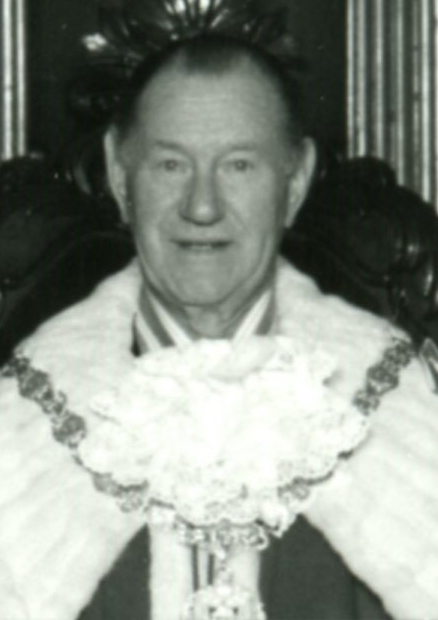
Jim Barnes

== Events ==
- 1 January – The 1973 New Year Honours are announced
- 11 January – Air New Zealand accepts delivery of its first McDonnell Douglas DC-10, the airline's first wide-body jet.
- 4 February – The details of the Trans-Tasman Travel Arrangement are announced
- 7 February – A heat wave affects large parts of New Zealand. Rangiora reaches 42.4 °C (108.3 °F), the highest temperature recorded in New Zealand as of December 2023.
- 11 February – The Rolling Stones play a single New Zealand concert, at Western Springs Stadium, Auckland, on their 1973 Pacific Tour.
- 27 February – Leaking drums of organophosphate cotton defoliant spread fumes across Parnell, Auckland, causing 640 people to be treated in hospital and 6,000 people to be evacuated.
- 1 March – The Trans-Tasman Travel Arrangement is implemented
- 10 April – Prime Minister Kirk cancels the 1973 South African rugby tour to New Zealand over fears of civil unrest.
- 16 April – After a retrial, Arthur Allan Thomas is again found guilty of the murders of Harvey and Jeannette Crewe.
- 2 June – The 1973 Queen's Birthday Honours are announced
- 19 October – The New Zealand Day Act 1973, making 6 February a national holiday, receives royal assent.
- 31 October – Colour television is introduced.
- December – The national vehicle speed limit is reduced to 80 km/h to reduce fuel consumption.

== Arts and literature ==
- Graham Billing wins the Robert Burns Fellowship.

See 1973 in art, 1973 in literature

=== Music ===
==== New Zealand Music Awards ====
- ALBUM OF THE YEAR John Donoghue – Spirit Of Pelorus Jack
- RECORDING ARTIST / GROUP OF THE YEAR Shona Laing
- BEST SINGLE / SINGLE OF THE YEAR John Hanlon – Damn The Dam
- BEST NEW ARTIST Shona Laing
- BEST NZ RECORDED COMPOSITION Anna Leah – Love Bug
- PRODUCER OF THE YEAR Keith Southern – Join Together
- ENGINEER OF THE YEAR Peter Hitchcock – Only Time Could Let Us Know
- ARRANGER OF THE YEAR Mike Harvey – Damn The Dam

See: 1973 in music

=== Performing arts ===
- Benny Award presented by the Variety Artists Club of New Zealand to Ray Columbus.

=== Radio and television ===
- Colour television broadcasts begin at 7:45 pm on 31 October. The licence fee for a colour television is NZ$35.
- In December, Fred Dagg makes his first appearance.
- Feltex Television Awards:
  - Natural History Programme: Bird of a Single Flight
  - Best News, Current Affairs: Election Night '72
  - Best Light Entertainment: Loxene Golden Disc 1972
  - Best Drama and the Arts: Gone Up North for a While and An Awful Silence
  - Best Documentary: Deciding
  - Allied Crafts: Loxene Golden Disc set and work on Pop Co.
- The first ZM radio stations were started in 1973 as 1ZM Auckland, 2ZM Wellington and 3ZM Christchurch.

See: 1973 in New Zealand television, 1973 in television, List of TVNZ television programming, Category:Television in New Zealand, Category:New Zealand television shows, Public broadcasting in New Zealand

=== Film ===
- Rangi's Catch

See: Category:1973 film awards, 1973 in film, List of New Zealand feature films, Cinema of New Zealand, Category:1973 films

== Sport ==
=== Athletics ===
- Terry Manners wins his first national title in the men's marathon, clocking 2:18:28.7 on 10 March in Inglewood. In the same year, on 1 December, the title is taken over by John Robinson who wins his first national title, clocking 2:15:03.6 in Christchurch.

=== Chess ===
- The 80th National Chess Championship is held in Wellington, and is won by Ortvin Sarapu of Auckland (his 12th title).

=== Horse racing ===
From January 1973, all races are run at metric distances rather than imperial.

==== Harness racing ====
- New Zealand Trotting Cup – Arapaho
- Auckland Trotting Cup – Arapaho

=== Soccer ===
- New Zealand National Soccer League is won by Christchurch United
- The Chatham Cup is won by Mount Wellington who beat North Shore United 3–0 in the final
- New Zealand hosts and wins the inaugural Oceania Cup tournament, beating Tahiti 2–0 in the final

== Births ==
- 25 January: Ruben Wiki, rugby league footballer
- 20 February: Leisen Jobe, field hockey player
- 1 April: Stephen Fleming, cricketer
- 8 April: Nicholas Tongue, freestyle swimmer
- 27 May:
  - Tana Umaga, rugby player
  - Ian Winchester, athlete
- 16 June: Shane Reed, athlete (died 2022)
- 2 July: Andrew Buckley, field hockey player
- 10 July: Andrew McCormick, rugby union footballer
- 23 July: Adrian Cashmore, rugby player
- 31 July: Tasha Williams, hammer thrower
- 4 August: Hymie Gill, field hockey player
- 5 August: Justin Marshall, rugby player
- 13 August: Martin Moana, rugby league footballer
- 19 August: Carl Bulfin, cricketer
- 23 August: Kerry Walmsley, cricketer
- 5 September: Lesley Nicol, netball player
- 1 September: Trent Bray, freestyle swimmer
- 14 November: Darren Smith, field hockey player
- 15 November: Shayne O'Connor, cricketer
- 16 November: Brendan Laney, rugby player
- 29 December: Garth da Silva, boxer
- Kirsten Cameron, swimmer
- Dom Harvey, podcaster and former radio host

== Deaths ==
- 5 February – John Stewart, politician (born 1902)
- 11 April – Rongowhakaata Pere Halbert, Māori leader, interpreter, historian, genealogist (born 1894)
- 20 May – Charles Brasch, poet and literary editor (born 1909)
- 18 November – Peter McKeefry, Roman Catholic bishop and cardinal (born 1899)
- 19 November – Cyril Allcott, cricketer (born 1896)
- 15 December – Keith Buttle, mayor of Auckland (born 1900)

=== Full date unknown ===
- Edith Louisa Niederer, farmer and community leader (born 1890)

== See also ==
- List of years in New Zealand
- Timeline of New Zealand history
- History of New Zealand
- Military history of New Zealand
- Timeline of the New Zealand environment
- Timeline of New Zealand's links with Antarctica

For world events and topics in 1973 not specifically related to New Zealand see: 1973
