= 1972 in New Zealand =

- Decades: 1950s; 1960s; 1970s; 1980s; 1990s
- See also: History of New Zealand; List of years in New Zealand; Timeline of New Zealand history

The following lists events that happened during 1972 in New Zealand.

== Population ==
- Estimated population as of 31 December: 2,959,700.
- Increase since 31 December 1971: 61,200 (2.11%).
- Males per 100 females: 99.7.

== Incumbents ==
=== Regal and viceregal ===
- Head of State – Elizabeth II
- Governor-General – Sir Arthur Porritt Bt GCMG GCVO CBE, followed by Sir Denis Blundell GCMG GCVO KBE QSO.

=== Government ===
The 36th Parliament of New Zealand concluded. A general election was held on 25 November and saw the second National government defeated by a large margin, with the Labour Party winning 55 of 87 seats in Parliament.

- Speaker of the House – Roy Jack until 8 December, then Alfred Allen.
- Prime Minister – Keith Holyoake then Jack Marshall then Norman Kirk
- Deputy Prime Minister – Jack Marshall then Robert Muldoon then Hugh Watt.
- Minister of Finance – Robert Muldoon then Bill Rowling.
- Minister of Foreign Affairs – Keith Holyoake then Jack Marshall then Norman Kirk.
- Attorney-General – Dan Riddiford until 9 February, then Roy Jack until 8 December, then Martyn Finlay.
- Chief Justice — Sir Richard Wild

=== Parliamentary opposition ===
- Leader of the Opposition – Norman Kirk (Labour) until 8 December, then Jack Marshall (National).

=== Main centre leaders ===
- Mayor of Auckland – Dove-Myer Robinson
- Mayor of Hamilton – Mike Minogue
- Mayor of Wellington – Frank Kitts
- Mayor of Christchurch – Neville Pickering
- Mayor of Dunedin – Jim Barnes

== Events ==
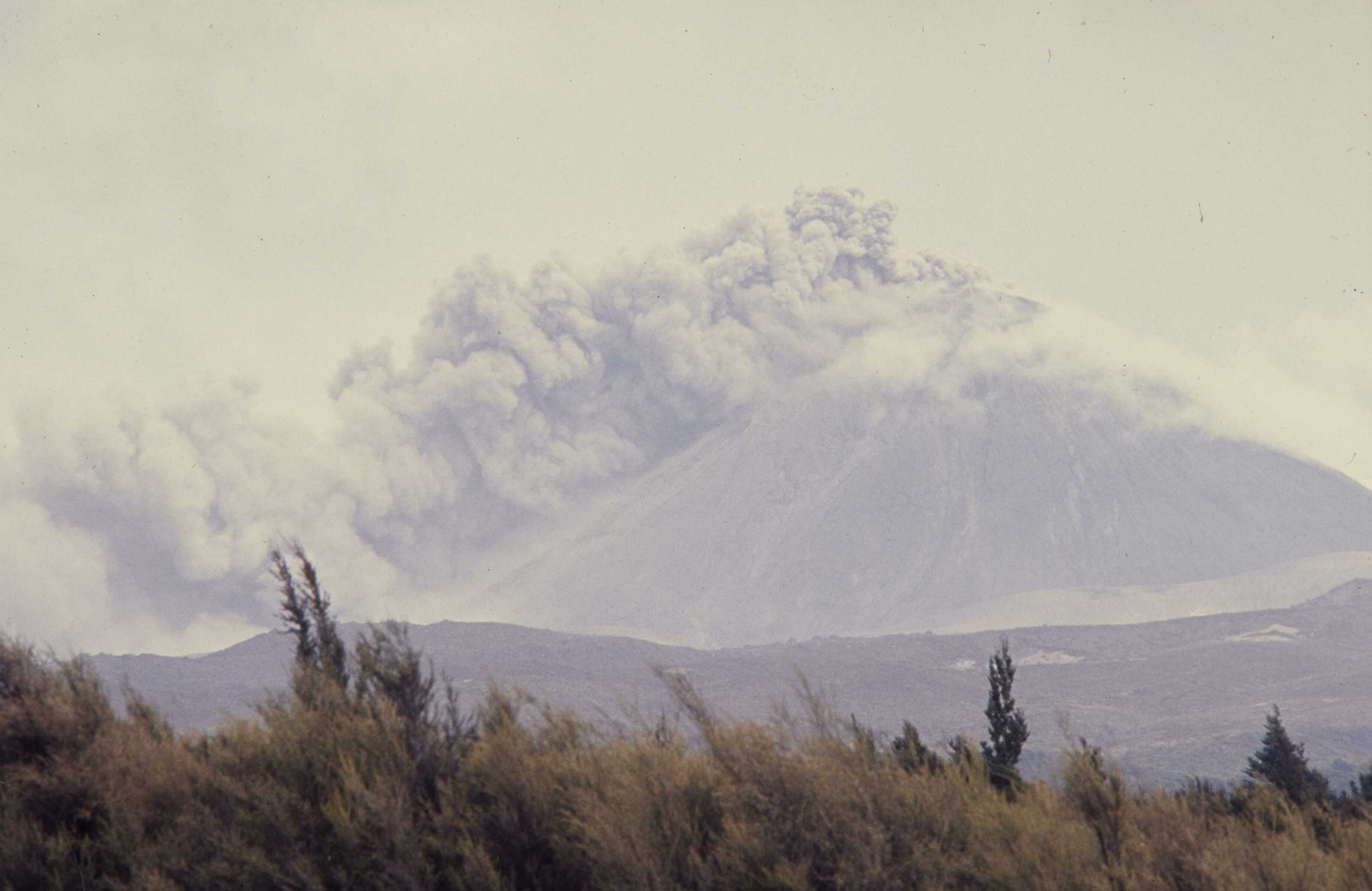
Mount Ngauruhoe eruption

- 7 February – Jack Marshall replaces Keith Holyoake as prime minister.
- 14 September – As a part of the Māori protest movement, activist group Ngā Tamatoa, the Te Reo Māori Society of Victoria University, and Te Huinga Rangatahi (the New Zealand Māori Students’ Association) presented a petition signed by over 33,000 people calling for te Reo Māori to be taught in schools, leading to the creation of te Wiki o te Reo Māori (Māori Language Week) in 1975, and a revitalisation of Māori language.
- 20 October – Restrictions on the manufacture and sale of margarine in New Zealand are removed.
- 25 November – The 1972 general election is held. The Labour Party, led by Norman Kirk, wins 55 of the 87 seats and forms the third Labour government.
- 3 December – Qantas commences the first Boeing 747 service in New Zealand, between Christchurch and Sydney.
- 8 December – Qantas commences Boeing 747 service between Auckland and Sydney.
- Chile and New Zealand establish embassies in each other's capitals.
- The Values Party is formed.
- Mount Ngauruhoe erupts.

== Arts and literature ==
- Ian Wedde wins the Robert Burns Fellowship.

See 1972 in art, 1972 in literature

=== Music ===
==== New Zealand Music Awards ====
- Loxene Golden Disc Suzanne – Sunshine Through A Prism
- Loxene Golden Disc Creation – Carolina

See: 1972 in music

=== Performing arts ===
- Benny Award presented by the Variety Artists Club of New Zealand to Jon Zealando and Lou Clauson QSM.

=== Radio and Television ===
- The Broadcasting Authority in March grants the right to broadcast a second television channel to the private consortium Independent Television Corporation. After the election of the Labour Government in November, Norman Kirk announces the second channel will be run by NZBC.
- In September, the first live broadcast of an All Black match takes place. The All Blacks played against Australia.
- Feltex Television Awards:
  - Best Programme: Charlie's Rock – Pukemanu
  - Outstanding Performance: Peter Sinclair in Golden Disc Award
  - Best Drama: Charlie's Rock – Pukemanu

See: 1972 in New Zealand television, 1972 in television, List of TVNZ television programming, Public broadcasting in New Zealand

=== Film ===
- To Love a Māori

See: 1972 in film, List of New Zealand feature films, Cinema of New Zealand

== Sport ==
=== Athletics ===
- Field events within New Zealand switch from imperial to metric measurements. Track events changed earlier in 1969.
- David McKenzie wins his fourth and last national title in the men's marathon, clocking 2:14:11.2 on 11 March in Dunedin.

=== Chess ===
- The 79th National Chess Championship is held in Hamilton, and is won by R.J. Sutton of Auckland (his third title).

=== Horse racing ===
==== Harness racing ====
- New Zealand Trotting Cup: Globe Bay
- Auckland Trotting Cup: Royal Ascot

=== Olympic Games ===
==== Summer Olympics ====
Gold	Silver	Bronze	Total
1	1	1	3

- New Zealand sends a team of 89 competitors.

==== Winter Olympics ====
Gold	Silver	Bronze	Total
0	0	0	0

- New Zealand sends a team of two alpine skiers.

=== Paralympic Games ===
==== Summer Paralympics ====
- New Zealand sends a team of 10 competitors.

Gold	Silver	Bronze	Total
3	3	3	9

=== Soccer ===
- New Zealand National Soccer League won by Mt. Wellington AFC
- The Chatham Cup is won by Christchurch United who met Mount Wellington.
  - Final 4-4 after extra time
  - First replay 1-1 after extra time
  - Second replay 2-1

== Births ==
- 3 January: Shaun Longstaff, rugby player
- 9 January: Gary Stead, cricketer
- 3 March: Peter O'Leary, soccer referee
- 27 March: David Bain, originally served 12 years for murder of his family, conviction quashed by Privy Council and subsequently found not guilty at retrial.
- 29 March: Paul Kent, swimmer
- 12 April: Jenny Shepherd, field hockey player
- 17 April: Dylan Mika, All Black (died 20 March 2018)
- 16 May: Matthew Hart, cricketer
- 3 June: Robert Kennedy, cricketer
- 7 June: Karl Urban, actor
- 11 June: Stephen Kearney, rugby league player and coach
- 21 June (in South Africa): Irene van Dyk, netball player
- 4 July: Craig Spearman, cricketer
- 12 August: Tony Marsh, rugby player
- 6 October: Brooke Howard-Smith, broadcaster.
- 27 October: John Steel, swimmer
- 16 December: Angela Bloomfield, actress
- 18 December: Julian Arahanga, actor
- 20 December: Jonathan Wyatt, long-distance runner
- Veeshayne Armstrong, television presenter.
- (in Britain): Warwick Murray, academic.
- (in Hong Kong): Jack Yan, publisher, designer and businessman

== Deaths ==
=== March ===
- 2 March – Billy Wallace, rugby player and All Black (born 1878)
- 4 March – Major-General Sir Harold Barrowclough, former chief justice (born 1894)

=== April ===
- 14 April – Bert Hawthorne, motor racing driver (born 1943)

=== July ===
- 10 July – Charles Bowden, politician (born 1886)

=== August ===
- 8 August – Agnes Weston, politician (MLC) (born 1879)

=== September ===
- 8 September – Harold Temple White, music teacher, conductor, organist and composer (born 1881)

=== October ===
- 5 October – Jim Barclay, politician (born 1882)
- 8 October – Laurie Brownlie, rugby player and All Black (born 1899)
- 20 October – John Pascoe, photographer and mountaineer (born 1908)
- 22 October – James K. Baxter, poet (born 1926)

=== December ===
- 11 December – John Mills, cricketer (born 1905)
- 26 December – Ronald Hugh Morrieson, writer (born 1922)

== See also ==
- 1972 in science
- 1972 in Australia
- History of New Zealand
- Military history of New Zealand
- Timeline of the New Zealand environment
- Timeline of New Zealand history
- Timeline of New Zealand's links with Antarctica
