= 1971 in New Zealand =

- Decades: 1950s; 1960s; 1970s; 1980s; 1990s
- See also: History of New Zealand; List of years in New Zealand; Timeline of New Zealand history

The following lists events that happened during 1971 in New Zealand.

== Population ==
- Estimated population as of 31 December: 2,898,500.
- Increase since 31 December 1970: 46,400 (1.63%).
- Males per 100 females: 99.7.

== Incumbents ==
=== Regal and viceregal ===
- Head of State – Elizabeth II
- Governor-General – Sir Arthur Porritt Bt GCMG GCVO CBE.

=== Government ===
The 36th Parliament of New Zealand continued, with the second National government in power.

- Speaker of the House – Roy Jack.
- Prime Minister – Keith Holyoake
- Deputy Prime Minister – Jack Marshall.
- Minister of Finance – Robert Muldoon.
- Minister of Foreign Affairs – Keith Holyoake.
- Attorney-General – Jack Marshall until 2 February, then Dan Riddiford.
- Chief Justice — Sir Richard Wild

=== Parliamentary opposition ===
- Leader of the Opposition – Norman Kirk (Labour).

=== Main centre leaders ===
- Mayor of Auckland – Dove-Myer Robinson
- Mayor of Hamilton – Mike Minogue
- Mayor of Wellington – Frank Kitts
- Mayor of Christchurch – Ron Guthrey then Neville Pickering
- Mayor of Dunedin – Jim Barnes

== Events ==
=== April ===
- The Tiwai Point Aluminium Smelter starts production.

=== August ===
- 29 August – The nation's first Kentucky Fried Chicken (KFC) restaurant opens in Royal Oak, Auckland, beginning a decade of American fast food chains being established in New Zealand.

=== September ===
- The Manapouri Power Station, the country's largest hydroelectric facility, is completed. It wouldn't export any electricity until April 1972 when transmission lines to Invercargill were completed.

=== October ===
- 25 October – The Christchurch to Dunedin overnight express becomes the last revenue steam locomotive-hauled train service, as the New Zealand Railways completes dieselisation.

== Arts and literature ==
- Noel Hilliard wins the Robert Burns Fellowship.

See 1971 in art, 1971 in literature

=== Music ===
==== New Zealand Music Awards ====
- Loxene Golden Disc Craig Scott – Smiley
- Loxene Golden Disc Chapta – Say A Prayer

See: 1971 in music

=== Performing arts ===
- Benny Award presented by the Variety Artists Club of New Zealand to Pat McMinn OBE.

=== Radio and television ===
- In 1971 there was a major breakthrough for international news when the Warkworth Satellite station was opened.
- The Melbourne Cup was the first live international broadcast, in November.
- The radio licence fee was abolished, and the television fee set at NZ$20 per year.
- Feltex Television Awards:
  - Best Programme: Gallery and In View of the Circumstances
  - Best Actor: Bruno Lawrence in Time Out
  - Best Performance as Frontman: Brian Edwards in Post Office Dispute
  - Best Entertainment: Dinah Lee
  - TVPDA Award for Allied Crafts: Waynne Williams

See: 1971 in New Zealand television, 1971 in television, List of TVNZ television programming, Category:Television in New Zealand, Category:New Zealand television shows, Public broadcasting in New Zealand

=== Film ===
See: Category:1971 film awards, 1971 in film, List of New Zealand feature films, Cinema of New Zealand, Category:1971 films

== Sport ==
=== Athletics ===
- David McKenzie wins his third national title in the men's marathon, clocking 2:17:16.4 on 6 March in Invercargill.

=== Chess ===
- The 78th National Chess Championship is held in Nelson, and is won by R.J. Sutton of Auckland (his second title).

=== Horse racing ===
==== Harness racing ====
- New Zealand Trotting Cup: True Averil
- Auckland Trotting Cup: Garcon Roux

=== Netball ===
- In the 1971 World Netball Tournament, New Zealand finished as runners up. In the tournament deciding match, they lost to Australia 48–42.

=== Soccer ===
- New Zealand National Soccer League won by Eastern Suburbs AFC
- The Chatham Cup is won by Western Suburbs FC of Wellington who beat Wellington City 3–2 in the final.

== Births ==
- 23 January: Adam Parore, cricketer.
- 5 March: Cory Hutchings, surf livesaving and ironman competitor.
- 29 March: Julie Seymour, netball player.
- 11 April: Mark Cooksley, rugby union player.
- 12 April: Greg Russ, field hockey player.
- 28 April: Hamish Carter, triathlete.
- 2 June: Dion Gosling, field hockey player.
- 11 June: Mark Richardson, cricketer
- 18 June: Blair Pocock, cricketer.
- 20 June: Josh Kronfeld, rugby union player.
- 25 June: Paul Gibbons, pole vaulter.
- 9 August: Jon Toogood, musician, songwriter.
- 15 August: Umesh Parag, field hockey player.
- 18 August: Jonathan Winter, swimmer.
- 24 August: Heremaia Ngata, soccer player.
- 27 August: Glen Osborne, rugby union player.
- 15 September: Nathan Astle, cricketer.
- 18 September: Tom Larkin, musician.
- 20 September: Todd Blackadder, rugby union player.
- 8 October: Marc Ellis, rugby union and rugby league player, television personality.
- 20 October: Rachel House, actress and comedian
- 25 October: Martin Leslie, rugby union player.
- 31 October: Phil Tataurangi, golfer.
- 20 November: Dion Nash, cricketer.
- 30 November: Heath Davis, cricketer.
- 13 December: Vaughan Coveny, soccer player.
- 20 December: Simon O'Neill, opera singer.
- 24 December: Geoff Allott, cricketer.

Category:1971 births

== Deaths ==
- 16 January: Harold Abbott, rugby union player.
- 12 March: Robert Laidlaw, businessman.
- 28 March: Miriam Soljak, feminist and activist
- 24 June: Jack Dunning, cricketer.
- 13 July: R. A. K. Mason, poet.
- 19 September: Ted Badcock, cricketer.
- 10 October: John Cawte Beaglehole, historian and biographer.
- 15 December: Air Marshall Roderick Carr
- 22 December: Mary Grigg, politician.

== See also ==
- List of years in New Zealand
- Timeline of New Zealand history
- History of New Zealand
- Military history of New Zealand
- Timeline of the New Zealand environment
- Timeline of New Zealand's links with Antarctica
