= 1974 in New Zealand =

- Decades: 1950s; 1960s; 1970s; 1980s; 1990s
- See also: History of New Zealand; List of years in New Zealand; Timeline of New Zealand history

The following lists events that happened during 1974 in New Zealand.

== Population ==
- Estimated population as of 31 December: 3,091,900.
- Increase since 31 December 1973: 65,200 (2.20%).
- Males per 100 females: 99.7.

== Incumbents ==
=== Regal and viceregal ===
- Head of State – Elizabeth II
- Governor-General – Sir Denis Blundell GCMG GCVO KBE QSO.

=== Government ===
The 37th New Zealand Parliament continued. Government was by a Labour majority of 55 seats to the National Party's 32 seats.

- Speaker of the House – Stan Whitehead.
- Prime Minister – Norman Kirk then Bill Rowling
- Deputy Prime Minister – Hugh Watt then Bob Tizard
- Minister of Finance – Bill Rowling then Bob Tizard.
- Minister of Foreign Affairs – Norman Kirk then Bill Rowling.
- Attorney-General – Martyn Finlay.

=== Parliamentary opposition ===
- Leader of the Opposition – Jack Marshall (National) until 4 July, then Robert Muldoon (National).

=== Main centre leaders ===
- Mayor of Auckland – Dove-Myer Robinson
- Mayor of Hamilton – Mike Minogue
- Mayor of Wellington – Frank Kitts then Michael Fowler
- Mayor of Christchurch – Neville Pickering then Hamish Hay
- Mayor of Dunedin – Jim Barnes

== Events ==
- 24 January – 2 February: Christchurch hosts the 1974 British Commonwealth Games.
- 30 January – 8 February: Royal visit by the Queen for the Commonwealth Games and Waitangi Day accompanied by the Duke, Princess Anne, Mark Phillips and then-Charles, Prince of Wales (later King Charles III.)
- 6 February – Waitangi Day, then named New Zealand Day, is first celebrated as a nationwide public holiday.
- 1 April – The Accident Compensation Commission is established, providing universal no-fault accidental injury cover to all New Zealanders.
- 9 April – Dunedin experiences a magnitude 4.9 earthquake which causes $3.5 million (2024 terms) in damages.
- August – The Government approved Sunburst as the first ohu, a type of rural intentional community, near Whitianga, Coromandel.
- 31 August – Prime Minister Norman Kirk dies of heart complications, aged 51. He was replaced by Bill Rowling, see New Zealand Labour Party leadership election, 1974.
- September – The country's first Pizza Hut restaurant opens in New Lynn, Auckland.
- The voting age is lowered from 20 to 18 years.

== Arts and literature ==
- Hone Tuwhare wins the Robert Burns Fellowship.

See 1974 in art, 1974 in literature

=== Music ===
==== New Zealand Music Awards ====
- BEST NEW ARTIST Bunny Walters
- RECORDING ARTIST / GROUP OF THE YEAR Bull Dogs All-Star Goodtime Band
- BEST NZ RECORDED COMPOSITION John Hanlon – Is It Natural
- PRODUCER OF THE YEAR Mike Harvey – Is It Natural
- ARRANGER OF THE YEAR Mike Harvey – Is It Natural

See: 1974 in music

=== Performing arts ===
- Benny Award presented by the Variety Artists Club of New Zealand to Les Andrews.

=== Radio and television ===
- The target delivery date for colour television for all New Zealanders was when the country hosted the 1974 Commonwealth Games.
- 17 October – Coronation Street episode 924, the first Coronation Street episode filmed in colour, airs on NZBC TV.
- Feltex Television Awards:
  - Best Programme: Richard John Seddon - Premier
  - Best Performer: Bill McCarthy
  - Best Actor: Tony Currie as Seddon
  - Writing: Alexander Guyan in Lunch with Richard Burton
  - Allied Crafts: Janice Wharekawa – Vision Mixer for Happen Inn and others
  - Special Award: Television team for the 1974 Commonwealth Games

See: 1974 in New Zealand television, 1974 in television, Category:Television in New Zealand, List of TVNZ television programming, Category:New Zealand television shows, Public broadcasting in New Zealand

=== Film ===
See: Category:1974 film awards, 1974 in film, List of New Zealand feature films, Cinema of New Zealand, Category:1974 films

== Sport ==
=== British Commonwealth Games ===
Gold	Silver	Bronze	Total
9	8	18	35

=== Chess ===
- The 81st National Chess Championship is held in Christchurch. The title is shared by P.A. Garbett and Ortvin Sarapu, both of Auckland.

=== Horse racing ===
==== Harness racing ====
- Robalan defeats hot favourite Young Quinn to win the New Zealand Trotting Cup
- Auckland Trotting Cup: Young Quinn

=== Soccer ===
- New Zealand National Soccer League won by, Mount Wellington
- The Chatham Cup is won by Christchurch United who beat Wellington Diamond United 2–0 in the final.

== Births ==
- 6 January: Dion Waller, rugby player
- 10 January: Jemaine Clement, comedian
- 28 February: Moana Mackey, politician
- 21 March: Rhys Darby, actor and comedian
- 27 April (in Australia): Richard Johnson, soccer player
- 6 May: Sean Pero Cameron, basketball player
- 25 May: James Reid, singer, guitarist and founder of The Feelers
- 2 June: Andy Booth, motor racing driver
- 15 June: Andrew Timlin, field hockey player
- 10 July: Chris Drum, cricketer
- 14 July (in Bulgaria): Pavlina Nola, tennis player
- 26 July: Kees Meeuws, rugby player
- 1 August: Michelle Turner, field hockey player
- 27 August: Michael Mason, cricketer
- 15 September: Emily Drumm, cricketer
- 11 October: Liz Couch, skeleton racer
- 23 October: Beatrice Faumuina, discus thrower
- 5 November: Taine Randell, rugby player
- 13 November: Carl Hoeft, rugby player
- 22 November: Oliver Driver, actor, director, broadcoaster and television presenter
- 2 December: Robbie Hart, cricketer
- 7 December: Jason Spice, rugby and cricket player
- 10 December: Chris Martin, cricketer
- Kate Duignan, novelist
- Tim Selwyn, activist

Category:1974 births

== Deaths ==
- 12 February: Alice Bush, doctor and medical activist.
- 13 February: Murray Hudson GC, soldier.
- 13 February: Sir Leslie Munro, diplomat and politician.
- 14 February: Charles 'Stewie' Dempster, cricketer.
- 5 August: Robert McKeen, politician – 12th Speaker of the House of Representatives.
- 12 August: James Fletcher, industrialist.
- 30 August: Professor George Jobberns, academic.
- 31 August: Norman Kirk, Prime Minister.
- 7 September: Paddy Kearins, politician.
- 12 September: Hector Bolitho, writer and biographer.
- 26 October: Dan Riddiford, politician.
- 28 October: Charles Elliot Fox, missionary.
- 11 December: Maurice Duggan, writer.

== See also ==
- List of years in New Zealand
- Timeline of New Zealand history
- History of New Zealand
- Military history of New Zealand
- Timeline of the New Zealand environment
- Timeline of New Zealand's links with Antarctica
