= 1978 in New Zealand =

- Decades: 1950s; 1960s; 1970s; 1980s; 1990s
- See also: History of New Zealand; List of years in New Zealand; Timeline of New Zealand history

The following lists events that happened during 1978 in New Zealand.

== Population ==
- Estimated population as of 31 December: 3,165,200.
- Change since 31 December 1977: -1,200 (-0.04%).
- Males per 100 females: 99.2.
- This was the first year since 1941 in which New Zealand's population declined (due to emigration, largely to Australia).

== Incumbents ==
=== Regal and viceregal ===
- Head of State – Elizabeth II
- Governor-General – The Rt Hon. Sir Keith Holyoake KG GCMG CH QSO.

=== Government ===
- Speaker of the House – Richard Harrison.
- Prime Minister – Robert Muldoon
- Deputy Prime Minister – Brian Talboys.
- Minister of Finance – Robert Muldoon.
- Minister of Foreign Affairs – Brian Talboys.
- Attorney-General – Peter Wilkinson until 13 December, then Jim McLay.
- Chief Justice — Sir Richard Wild (until 20 January), Sir Ronald Davison (starting 3 February)

=== Parliamentary opposition ===
- Leader of the Opposition – Bill Rowling (Labour).
- Social Credit Party – Bruce Beetham

=== Main centre leaders ===
- Mayor of Auckland – Dove-Myer Robinson
- Mayor of Hamilton – Ross Jansen
- Mayor of Wellington – Michael Fowler
- Mayor of Christchurch – Hamish Hay
- Mayor of Dunedin – Clifford George (Cliff) Skeggs

== Events ==
- The Pureora Forest Park was established after a series of protests and tree sittings.
- 18 February – The Rangitikei by-election was won by Bruce Beetham for Social Credit.
- 1 April – Flag carriers Air New Zealand and the National Airways Corporation merge to form a single airline under the Air New Zealand name.
- 25 April – A 506 day long Māori occupation of and protest in Bastion Point ends.
- 12 September – Kaimai Rail Tunnel on the East Coast Main Trunk Railway, at 8896 m the longest tunnel in New Zealand, opened.
- December – Holy Name Seminary, Christchurch (Catholic) closed.

== Arts and literature ==
- Barry Thomas's Vacant Lot of Cabbages was a six month long occupation that issued in a new wave in public art.
- Roger Hall and Peter Olds win the Robert Burns Fellowship.

See 1978 in art, 1978 in literature, Category:1978 books

=== January ===
- Nambassa, three-day music, crafts and alternative lifestyles festival on Phil and Pat Hulses' 400-acre (1.6 km^{2}) farm in Golden Valley, north of Waihi. Attendance 25,000.

=== October ===
- Nambassa winter road show, toured the North Island of NZ, promoting the 1979 festival.

=== Music ===
==== New Zealand Music Awards ====
Winners were as follows:

- ALBUM OF THE YEAR Hello Sailor – Hello Sailor
- SINGLE OF THE YEAR Golden Harvest – I Need Your Love
- TOP MALE VOCALIST John Rowles
- TOP GROUP Hello Sailor
- TOP FEMALE VOCALIST Sharon O’Neill
- ENGINEER OF THE YEAR Ian Morris – Hello Sailor
- PRODUCER OF THE YEAR Rob Aicken – Hello Sailor
- MOST PROMISING GROUP Citizen Band
- MOST PROMISING FEMALE VOCALIST Kim Hart
- MOST PROMISING MALE VOCALIST Dennis O’Brien

See: 1978 in music

=== Performing arts ===
- Benny Award presented by the Variety Artists Club of New Zealand to George Tumahai.

=== Radio and television ===
- 23 November – the AM broadcast band moves from 10 kHz spacing to 9 kHz spacing, in line with the Geneva Frequency Plan of 1975.
- Feltex Television Awards:
  - Best Current Affairs: Dateline Monday
  - Best Information: Fair Go
  - Best Documentary: Birth with R.D. Laing
  - Best Light Entertainment: A Week of It
  - Best Drama: The Governor
  - Best Speciality: Sport on One
  - Best Actor: David McPhail on A Week of It
  - Best Personality: Roger Gascoigne
  - Best Script: He Iwi Ko Tahi Tatou: episode four of The Governor

See: 1978 in New Zealand television, 1978 in television, List of TVNZ television programming, Category:Television in New Zealand, Category:New Zealand television shows, Public broadcasting in New Zealand

=== Film ===
- Angel Mine
- Skin Deep

See: Category:1978 film awards, 1978 in film, List of New Zealand feature films, Cinema of New Zealand, Category:1978 films

== Sport ==
=== Athletics ===
- Paul Ballinger wins his first national title in the men's marathon, clocking 2:17:33 on 11 March in Hastings.

=== Chess ===
- The 85th New Zealand Chess Championship is held in Wellington, and is won by Craig Laird of Tauranga.

=== Commonwealth Games ===
Gold	Silver	Bronze	Total
5	6	9	20

=== Cricket ===
- 15 February: After 48 years of trying, New Zealand beats England in a Test match for the first time, winning the Test at the Basin Reserve.

=== Horse racing ===
==== Harness racing ====
- New Zealand Trotting Cup: Trusty Scot
- Auckland Trotting Cup: Sole Command. From 1978–86 the race was over 2700m and there was no handicapping.

=== Soccer ===
- New Zealand National Soccer League won by Christchurch United
- The Chatham Cup is won by Manurewa who beat Nelson United 1–0 in the final.

== Births ==
- 2 January: Dan Ward-Smith, rugby union player
- 5 January: Adi Dick, musician.
- 21 January (in the United States): Mike Chappell, basketballer.
- 3 February: Keith Cameron, rugby union player.
- 26 February: Rico Gear, rugby union player.
- 8 April: Nathan Mauger, rugby union player.
- 29 April: Donna Loffhagen, netball and basketball player.
- 19 May: Willie Walker, rugby union player.
- 28 May: John Dennison, poet.
- 1 June: Ben Lummis, singer and winner of New Zealand Idol (season 1).
- 11 June: Daryl Tuffey, cricketer.
- 4 July: Bianca Russell, field hockey player.
- 6 July: Kevin Senio, rugby union player.
- 12 July: Claire Chitham, actor.
- 26 July: David Kosoof, field hockey player.
- 28 July: Jacob Oram, cricketer.
- 14 August (in South Africa): Greg Rawlinson, rugby union player.
- 5 September:
  - Chris Hipkins, politician.
  - Chris Jack, rugby union player.
- 13 September: Andrew Hore, rugby union player.
- 18 September: Iain Lees-Galloway, politician.
- 21 September: Doug Howlett, rugby union player.
- 10 October: Caroline and Georgina Evers-Swindell (twins), rowers, Olympic gold medallists (2004 Athens and 2008 Beijing)
- 26 October: Ricky Cockerill, figure skater.
- 6 November: Dean Kent, swimmer.
- 11 November: Lou Vincent, cricketer.
- 19 November (in Australia): Mahé Drysdale, rower, Olympic gold medallist (2012 London)
- 21 November: Paul Urlovic, soccer player.
- William Dwane Bell, convicted murderer.
- Mok TzeMing, writer.

Category:1978 births

== Deaths ==
- 6 January: Burt Munro, record-setting motorcyclist
- 30 March: Sir Charles William Hamilton (Bill Hamilton), inventor of the jetboat.
- 13 May: Alby Roberts, cricketer.
- 22 May: Sir Richard Wild, 9th Chief Justice of New Zealand.
- 23 July: Sir Ronald Algie, politician and former Speaker of the House of Representatives.
- 18 August: Ronald L. Meek, economist.
- John Hutton, glass engraver

Category:1978 deaths

== See also ==
- List of years in New Zealand
- Timeline of New Zealand history
- History of New Zealand
- Military history of New Zealand
- Timeline of the New Zealand environment
- Timeline of New Zealand's links with Antarctica
