= Alan Watson (magician) =

New Zealand magician (born 1950)

Alan Watson QSM
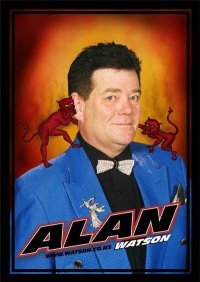
- Born: Alan Scott Watson; 26 November 1950 (age 75); Wellington, New Zealand
- Occupations: Magician; illusionist
- Spouse: Michele Watson
- Website: watson.co.nz

Alan Scott Watson QSM (born 26 November 1950) is a New Zealand professional magician. He has been performing professionally for more than 40 years and has been presented with some of magic's highest awards and accolades.

== Biography ==
Born in Wellington in 1950, Watson learned the art of magic from his great-great uncle, Oswald Ashton, at the age of seven.

He has appeared at the Magic Castle in Hollywood six times for a total of over 130 performances. He was the founder and administrator of the MagicNZ BBS in 1993. Watson also founded the Magic New Zealand e-zine and has acted as editor from 1999 to present. In 1995 he was awarded the MIMC with Gold Star, the highest degree member of The Magic Circle. Watson and his wife Michele were presented the DRAGON Award in New York 2002. In 2006 he was a recipient of the Benny Award from the Variety Artists Club of New Zealand Inc, their highest honour.

Watson served as President for the New Zealand Society of Magicians from 1981 to 1983 and then from 1986 to 1989. He is a life member of the International Brotherhood of Magicians, the Variety Artists Club of New Zealand and The Society of American Magicians. In 2019 he was named Patron of the International Brotherhood of Magicians Ring 160.

Watson performs in the areas of corporate and family magic shows. In most of his acts, his wife Michele plays his assistant.

He was presented with the 2014 Award of Merit from the Academy of Magical Arts.

He was awarded the Queen's Service Medal, for services as a magician, in the 2015 New Year Honours.

He served as President of the Brotherhood of Auckland Magicians 2012-2021 and 2023-2024.

In September 2025 Watson received a Lifetime Achievement Award from the Milbourne Christopher Foundation for his significant contributions to the art of magic.

To coincide with Watson’s 75th birthday in November 2025 he received a star on the New Zealand Walk of Fame which celebrates iconic New Zealand entertainers who have made a lasting impact on the country’s entertainment industry.

== Awards and honours ==
- 2025 - Star on New Zealand Walk of Fame, Orewa
- 2025 - Society of American Magicians Proclamation from the National President honouring outstanding contributions to magic
- 2025 - Presidential Citation from International Brotherhood of Magicians President
- 2025 - Lifetime Achievement Award, Milbourne Christopher Foundation
- 2024 - Magical Valentine Award, for continued contribution to the digital magic scene with Magic New Zealand, VANISH Magic Magazine
- 2023 - Presidential Citation - from The Society of American Magicians President - for major contributions to magic
- 2018 - Patron, International Brotherhood of Magicians Ring 160
- 2017 - Life Member, Brotherhood of Auckland Magicians Incorporated
- 2016 - Order of Merlin - Shield - from IBM International President - for a long-standing membership (35 years)
- 2015 - Queen's Service Medal (QSM) for services as a magician
- 2014 - Presidential Citation, Society of American Magicians
- 2014 - Award of Merit - Academy of Magical Arts
- 2014 - Hall of Fame - The Academy of Magical Arts - Hollywood, USA
- 2010 - Presidential Citation, Society of American Magicians
- 2006 – New Zealand Grand Master of Magic Award
- 2006 – Order of Merlin – International Brotherhood of Magicians
- 2006 – Benny Award – Variety Artists Club of New Zealand Inc
- 2005 – Presidential Citation from IBM International President
- 2005 – Best Mental Effect – Linking Ring Awards
- 2003 – Agnew Excellence Award – Variety Artists Club of New Zealand Inc
- 2002 – DRAGON Award – J. Marberger Stuart Foundation (2002)
- 1999 – Scroll of Honour – Variety Artists Club of New Zealand Inc
- 1997 – Shure Golden Microphone – Most Professional Entertainer – Variety Artists Club of New Zealand Inc
- 1995 – Member of the Inner Magic Circle (MIMC) with Gold Star – Magic Circle England
- 1990 – 1st Place Close-up – 22nd Australian Convention of Magicians
- 1983 - For Outstanding Support and Performance in the Magical Arts, Pacific Coast Association of Magicians
- 1982 – The Peter J. Shield Award – 18th Australian Convention of Magicians (for Outstanding Contribution to the Art of Mentalism)
- Six times Top Children's Entertainer – New Zealand International Magic Conventions
- Four times Top Close-up Magician – New Zealand International Magic Conventions
- Four times Top Magician – Variety Artists Club of New Zealand Inc

== Magic publications ==
Alan has been featured in the following magic publications :

- The Magic Circular - August 2015 - Front cover - Pages 234-237
- Vanish Magazine – April 2013 Front Cover – Pages 30–45
- The Linking Ring – November 2006 – Front cover – Pages 35–40 plus 68–70
- The Linking Ring – July 2004 – Kiwi Magic, pages 83–107
- Magicana – August/September 2002 – Front cover, pages 8–11
- The Linking Ring – November 1998 – Front cover – Kiwi Magic, pages 87–105
- M.U.M. magazine – September 1997 – Watson family front cover – Kiwi Magic, pages 15–25
- The Magic Circular [UK] – December 1995 – Front cover – New Zealand special section, pages 223–230. Also in this edition Peter Blanchard wrote a double page spread on the Watson family "This Is Your Life", pages 234–235
- Genii Magazine [US] – October 1992 – Front cover – New Zealand special issue for which Alan compiled, pages 805–819
- Magicana – October/November 1989 – Front cover
- Magicana – July/August 1984 – Front Cover, pages 5–7

== DVDs ==
- 2007 – Alan Watson's 7 Secrets to Success (2 DVD SET)

== Television appearances ==
- 2016 - The Guy Cater Show on Face TV, Sky 083
- 2014 - One Network News, TV3 News - upon being presented with the Queen's Service Medal
- 2007 – Studio 2 LIVE (NZ children's show) – with granddaughter Aleshia
- 2006 – Pacific Beat Street – with granddaughter Aleshia
- 2006 – What Now? – with granddaughter Aleshia
- 1996 – Good Morning
- 1996 – The Great Kiwi Magic Show

== Magic New Zealand e-zine ==
Watson published a weekly electronic newsletter, Magic New Zealand, from 1999 to 2024. The publication grew to more than 17,000 subscribers worldwide, including many well-known magicians, and featured articles, reviews, performance listings, and contributions from regular columnists.

On 8 November 2024, after 25 years of publication, Watson announced the closure of Magic New Zealand. The decision marked the end of an era and reflected broader shifts in news distribution influenced by the immediacy and global reach of social media.
