= Brendan Dugan =

Brendan Dugan may refer to:

- Brendan Dugan (musician) (born 1952), New Zealand country artist
- Brendan J. Dugan (1947–2016), president of St. Francis College
