= Brendan Dugan (musician) =

New Zealand country music musician

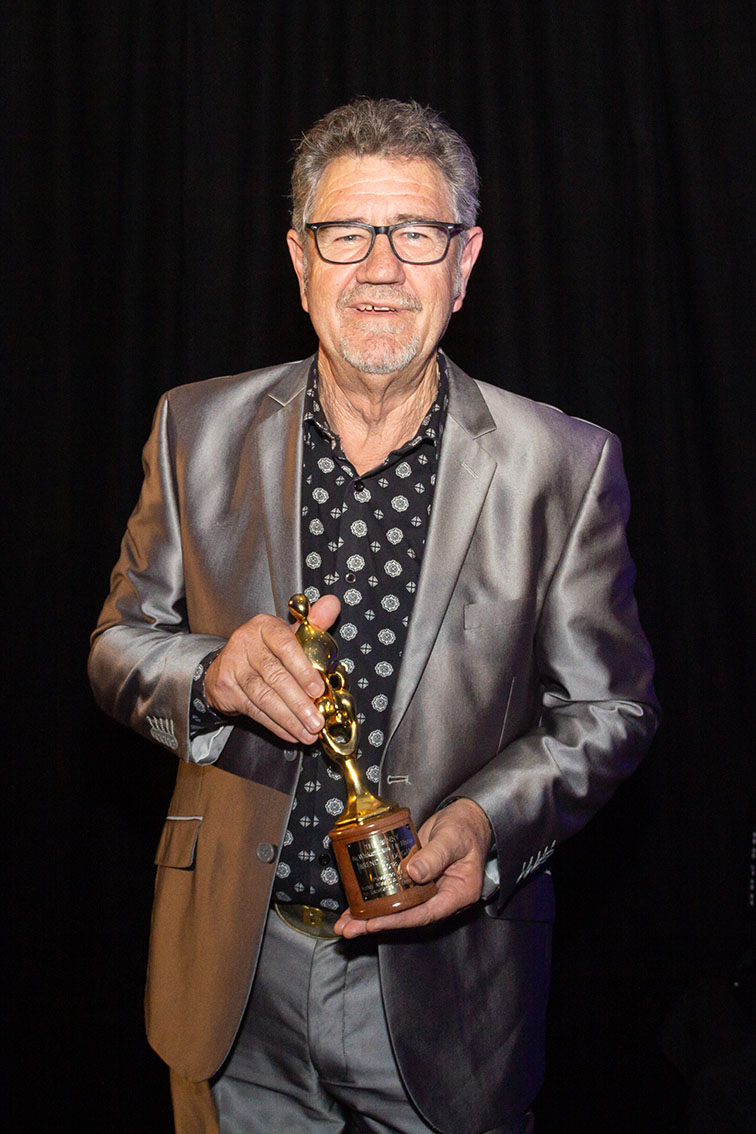
- Brendan Dugan with Benny Award, 2018
- Born: 29 February 1952 (age 73); Christchurch, New Zealand

Brendan Dugan (born 29 February 1952) is a New Zealand musician.

== Early life ==
Dugan's career began in 1968 at the age of sixteen, when he appeared on the television show New Faces and won the talent contest.

== Career ==
He subsequently released three albums for the British record label His Master's Voice before pairing with Gray Bartlett to make two singles. Dugan was later contracted to perform for US troops in Army bases throughout South-East Asia and later for the New Zealand Tourism Board to promote New Zealand in theatres throughout America. Dugan became a household name in New Zealand in the 1980s, starring on the television show That's Country. He was named New Zealand Entertainer of the Year in 1985. In 1990 Dugan, Bartlett and Jodi Vaughan reunited for the Together Again album on Festival and tour. The album hit number one and the tour was at the time the most successful ever in New Zealand. In 2018 he celebrated fifty years as an entertainer with the release of single "Honky Tonk Heroes". It spent four weeks at #1 on the Country Songs Top 40 Australian Airplay Chart.

== Awards ==
Brendan Dugan received the Benny Award in October 2018 from the Variety Artists Club of New Zealand. It is the highest honour for a "variety entertainer" in New Zealand.
