= Gray Bartlett =

New Zealand musician

Gray Bartlett MBE
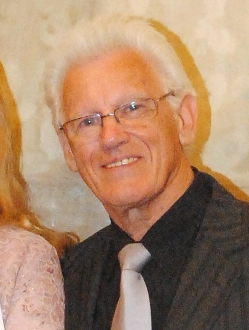
- Bartlett in 2012
- Born: Graham Neil Bartlett; 22 July 1942 (age 83); Auckland, New Zealand
- Occupations: Guitarist; producer; tour promoter; talent mentor
- Website: www.graybartlett.com

Graham Neil Bartlett MBE (born 22 July 1942), generally known as Gray Bartlett, is a New Zealand born guitarist, country music performer, producer, talent mentor, tour promoter and entrepreneur.

== Biography ==
=== Early life ===
He was born in Auckland and attended Auckland Grammar School. Aged fifteen he joined a local band called The Phantoms and was signed to Zodiac Records in 1961.

=== Career ===
Bartlett had a major hit record in Japan in 1965 with "La Playa", which featured in the Billboard music industry charts for ten weeks. He has sold over 410,000 singles and over 300,000 albums in Japan. He was presented with the first ever NZ International Gold Disc, presented in March 1968 for "La Playa".

He had his own show at the Tokyo Hilton in 1967, and was resident guitarist on Rolf Harris shows in England and Australia from 1968 to 1973. Bartlett has toured and supported many international acts including Connie Francis, Bobby Vee, The Ventures, Tom Jones, Herman's Hermits, Michael Crawford. In 1968 he joined since-convicted child abuser Rolf Harris for a New Zealand and Australian tour, leading to a seven-year musical relationship. Bartlett moved to England and performed with Harris at prestigious nightspots such as "The Talk of the Town".

Bartlett has released thirty albums including La Playa, Two Shades of Gray and Together Again (New Zealand gold albums in 1985 and 1990). His sales of music in China has been estimated by BMG Hong Kong to be approximately 1.6 million units.

=== Honours and awards ===
His numerous awards include the NZCMA Hands of Fame in 1981, Top NZ Country Band in 1983, NZ Country Instrumentalist of the Year in 1984 and 1986, Top Country Group of the Year 1984, Country Music Industry Golden Tribute Award for services to country music in 1988, and the Guangzhou (China) Golden Plume Award for Top Foreign Artist Sales in 1988. He was named New Zealand Country Music Artist of the Year 1990, Patron of the New Zealand Country Music Association from 1987, and was New Zealand Cultural Ambassador 1985–86.

Bartlett was appointed a Member of the Order of the British Empire in the 1987 New Year Honours, for services to entertainment.

=== Other ===
In 1980 he stood unsuccessfully for the Auckland City Council as an independent.

He composed The Ballad of Robbie Muldoon, and stood unsuccessfully for the National Party in Panmure in the 1990 election against Judith Tizard.

=== Concerts ===
Bartlett's 1990 Together Again national tour was named the Biggest Selling Concert Tour by New Zealand Artists and the companion album attained Gold status in seven days, making it the fastest selling album in New Zealand history.

He is Patron of the Variety Artists Club of New Zealand Inc and in 2001 he received their prestigious Benny Award, the highest honour for a New Zealand entertainer.

=== Production ===
He was the producer of the record-breaking Highway of Legends tours.

Bartlett was involved with establishing the careers of Yulia, Will Martin, Elizabeth Marvelly, Margaret Keys and others. His company New Zealand Entertainment Academy (NZEA) regularly promotes New Zealand tours by overseas stars.

=== Politics ===
Bartlett was an Auckland City Councillor for nine years until retiring from his position in 2001. He represented the Eastern Bays Ward for the Citizens & Ratepayers Association from 1992 to 1998 and as an independent from 1998 to 2001.

=== Patronage ===
In October 2017 he was presented with the President's Medallion from the Variety Artists Club of New Zealand in recognition of his services as Patron.
