= Oswald Cheesman =

New Zealand musician and conductor

Oswald Astley Cheesman MBE (13 September 1913 – 29 September 1985) was a New Zealand musician, music teacher, conductor and composer.

Cheesman was born in Christchurch, New Zealand, on 13 September 1913. After World War II, he was involved in forming first New Zealand Broadcasting Service's Auckland Radio Orchestra and then in 1946 and 1947 the National Orchestra, now the New Zealand Symphony Orchestra.

In 1970, he received the Benny Award from the Variety Artists Club of New Zealand Inc, the highest honour available to a New Zealand variety entertainer. In the 1972 Queen's Birthday Honours, he was appointed a Member of the Order of the British Empire, for services to music.

Cheesman married Elaine Court in Auckland in March 1939. They had three sons. Cheesman died in Auckland in September 1985, aged 72.
