= Max Cryer =

New Zealand musician and broadcaster (1935–2021)

Max Cryer MBE
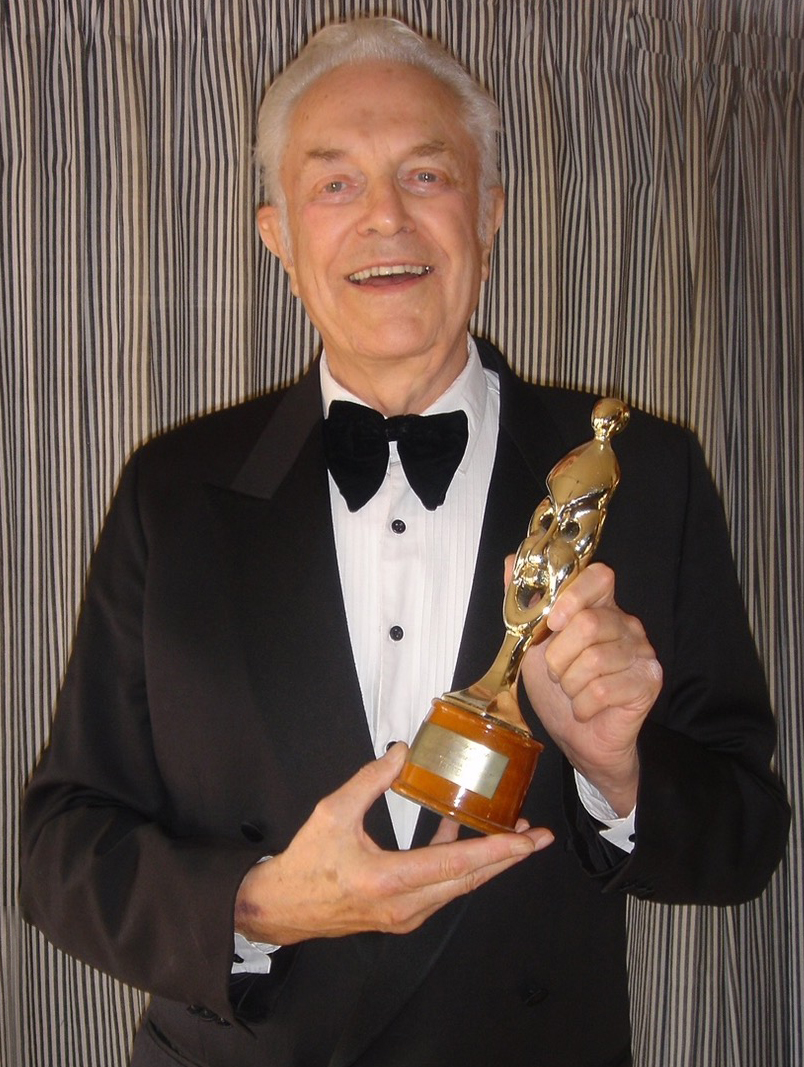
- Cryer in 2016
- Born: 10 December 1935; Ōtāhuhu, New Zealand
- Died: 25 August 2021 (aged 85)
- Occupations: Producer, entertainer

John Maxwell Cryer MBE (10 December 1935 – 25 August 2021), generally known as Max Cryer, was a New Zealand television producer and presenter, radio broadcaster, entertainment producer, singer, cabaret performer and writer.

== Early life and education ==
Cryer was born in Ōtāhuhu in 1935, the son of East Tāmaki farmer Arthur John "Jack" Cryer and his wife Jane Stewart, who farmed on Cryers Road, Tamaki, Auckland. He began learning the piano at the age of five and later played the double bass in the Auckland Junior Symphony Orchestra. He graduated from the University of Auckland with a Bachelor of Arts in 1958, and a Master of Arts with second-class honours in etymology and linguistics in 1959. After graduating in 1960, Cryer spent a year in Perugia, Italy studying singing and Italian.

== Career ==
While studying in Italy in 1960, Cryer earned money as a model and film extra. He then moved to London where he sang with the Sadlers Wells Company. Returning to New Zealand, he taught English and music at Otahuhu College and also began appearing on television as an interviewer and as host of quiz show Top of the Form. Cryer hosted an entertainment show called Cryer and the Children which ran for 10 years and resulted in 15 albums of songs.

In 1977 he moved into TV production producing programmes such as Mastermind and University Challenge.

He continued to perform as a narrator and on stage. Roles included Henry Higgins in My Fair Lady, Danilo in The Merry Widow, Prince Orlovsky in Die Fledermaus, and the King of Siam in The King and I.

Cryer was a host for radio and TV events including the first TV coverage of the Mobil Song Awards in 1963, and in 1969 the first nationwide simulcast of TV and radio and the first time TV was linked throughout New Zealand.

In addition to his TV and radio work he also wrote columns for The New Zealand Herald and the New Zealand Woman's Weekly and published a number of books.

He served on boards for the Auckland Festival, Central Theatre, Northern Opera and was a judge for the Watties Book Award.

== Honours and awards ==
Cryer's awards include New Zealand Entertainer of the Year in 1973, the Variety Artists of New Zealand's Benny Award in 1977 and the New Zealand 1990 Commemoration Medal for services to New Zealand. In the 1995 New Year Honours, he was appointed a Member of the Order of the British Empire for services to entertainment.

Cryer died on 25 August 2021, aged 85.

== Works ==
- Cat Miscellany (Blake Publishing 2005) ISBN 1-84454-169-X
- Curious Kiwi Words (HarperCollins 2002)
- Curious Questions (HarperCollins 2001)
- Curious Thoughts (HarperCollins 2002)
- Curious (Exisle, 2012)
- Curious English words and phrases: The truth behind the expressions we use (2020)
- Day by Day (Harper Moa Beckett, 1988) ISBN 1-86958-721-9
- Every Dog Has Its Day (Exile 2013) ISBN 978-1-921966-28-6
- Hear Our Voices, We Entreat (Exile 2004)
- Is It True ?? (Exile 2014) ISBN 9781921497452, ISBN 978-1-921966-48-4
- Love Me Tender (Exile 2008)
- Max Vocab, with Cherie Brown (Harcourt Education, 2004)
- Max Vocab: Fun Lessons in the English Language with Cherie Brown (Raupo Publishing (NZ) Ltd. 2004) ISBN 1-877348-53-8
- Max Vocab: Journeys in the English Language with Cherie Brown (Raupo Publishing (NZ) Ltd. 2004) ISBN 978-1-877348-53-2
- More Curious Questions ( HarperCollins, 2003)
- New Zealand Day by Day (Harper Moa Beckett, 1988)
- Preposterous Proverbs (Exile 2011) ISBN 978-1-921497-45-2
- Superstitions: And why we have them (Exisle Publishing 2016) ISBN 978-1-925335-17-0
- The Godzone Dictionary (Exile 2006)
- The Godzone Dictionary (Expanded Second edition) (Exile 2020)
- The Mastermind Quiz Book (BCNZ Enterprises,1985)
- Town Cryer (Collins, Auckland, 1978) ISBN 0-00-216934-7
- Who Said That First (Exile 2010)
- The Cat's Out Of The Bag (Exile 2015)

== See also ==
- List of New Zealand television personalities
