= Louise Corcoran =

New Zealand skeleton racer

Louise Corcoran (born 30 July 1979) is a New Zealand skeleton racer who has competed since 2000. She finished 12th in the women's skeleton event at the 2006 Winter Olympics in Turin. Her best World Cup result was 11th in Sigulda in 2005.

Corcoran's best finish at the FIBT World Championships was 16th in the women's skeleton event at Nagano in 2003.

Corcoran won the six race FIBT Americas Cup Series in 2008.

She first became interested in the sport in 1999, quitting her job as a guide and flying to Canada to participate in a five-day school that would qualify her for international competition.

She founded the Taniwha Sled Company with her brother, building skeleton sleds.

After winning the NBR Audacious Challenge on 15 September 2010, Ms. Corcoran announced plans to build the first bobsled track in New Zealand.
