= Janie Searle =

Jane Holden Searle (née Thompson; 15 April 1897 – 23 October 1969) was a New Zealand Salvation Army officer and community leader. She was born in Auckland, New Zealand, in 1897. Searle represented New Zealand at the International Council of Women conference in Istanbul in 1960.
