= Tony Good =

English cricketer

Personal information
- Full name: Antony John Good
- Born: 10 November 1952; Kumasi, Gold Coast
- Died: October 2025 (aged 72)
- Batting: Right-handed
- Bowling: Right-arm fast-medium

Domestic team information
- Years: Team
- 1979: Minor Counties North
- 1978: Minor Counties East
- 1977–1979: Cheshire
- 1973–1976: Lancashire

Career statistics
Competition	First-class	List A
Matches	8	11
Runs scored	10	16
Batting average	1.66	3.20
100s/50s	0/0	0/0
Top score	6	8
Balls bowled	915	451
Wickets	17	8
Bowling average	28.35	30.00
5 wickets in innings	1	0
10 wickets in match	0	0
Best bowling	5/62	3/21
Catches/stumpings	1/–	3/–
- Source: Cricinfo, 12 August 2012

Antony John Good (10 November 1952 – October 2025) was an English cricketer. Good was a right-handed batsman who bowled right-arm fast-medium pace. He was born at Kumasi in the British Gold Coast and attended Worksop College in North Nottinghamshire.

Good graduated from Durham University with a degree in geography in January 1975, having completed his course of study the previous summer.

He made his first-class debut for Lancashire against Gloucestershire at Old Trafford in the 1973 County Championship. This was his only first-class appearance for Lancashire in 1973, although he also made his List A debut in this season against Hampshire in the John Player League. His next appearance for Lancashire came in the 1975 County Championship against Warwickshire, in what was his only first team appearance in that season. In 1976, he appeared in six first-class matches, the last of which came against Middlesex at Lord's. He also made five List A appearances in this season, the last of which came against Hampshire in the John Player League at the County Ground, Southampton. In total, Good made eight first-class appearances for the county, taking 17 wickets at an average of 28.35, with best figures of 5/62, which came against Northamptonshire in 1976. In List A cricket, he made six appearances for the county, taking 5 wickets at an average of 32.60, with best figures of 2/31.

Good left Lancashire at the end of the 1976 season and proceeded to join Cheshire. He made his debut for the county in the 1977 Minor Counties Championship against the Somerset Second XI, with him making four further appearances during that season. Although he didn't feature for Cheshire in 1978, he did however made a single List A appearance for a Minor Counties East side against Northamptonshire in the Benson & Hedges Cup. In 1979, Good made four appearances for Cheshire in the Minor Counties Championship, the last of which came against Durham. He also made four List A appearances for Minor Counties North in that seasons Benson & Hedges Cup, playing against Kent, Middlesex, Yorkshire and Nottinghamshire, taking a total of 3 wickets at an average of 7.00, with best figures of 3/21.

Good died in October 2025, at the age of 72.
