= Brad Leonard =

New Zealand cricketer (born 1979)

Bradford Jon Leonard (born 8 November 1979 in Rotorua) is a New Zealand cricketer who made three appearances for Northern Districts cricket team during the 2005–06 season. A right-arm medium-fast bowler, he took two one day wickets.
