= 1976 in New Zealand television =

This is a list of New Zealand television-related events in 1976.

== Events ==
- TV2 is renamed South Pacific Television

== Debuts ==
=== Domestic ===
- 26 August - University Challenge (TV One) (1976–1989, 2014–present)
- That's Country (TVNZ) (1976–1983)

=== International ===
- 5 February - (United Kingdom) Shang-a-Lang (TV2)

== Television shows ==
- No information on television shows this year.

== Ending this year ==
- No shows ending this year.

== Channels ==
Launches:

- December: South Pacific Television
