= Leisen Jobe =

New Zealand field hockey player

Leisen Michelle Jobe (born 20 February 1973) is a retired female field hockey player from New Zealand.

She was born in Whangarei, Northland. She competed at the 2004 Summer Olympics, and with The Black Sticks team she finished in sixth place. She also competed in other tournaments.
