= Grant Donaldson =

New Zealand cricketer (born 1976)

Grant Thomas Donaldson (born 8 June 1976 in Upper Hutt) is a New Zealand cricketer who played for the Wellington Firebirds.
