= Pete Wheeler =

New Zealand artist

Pete Wheeler (born 1978 in Geraldine, New Zealand) is a New Zealand artist, currently living and working in Berlin, Germany.

Wheeler lived in Dunedin during the late 1990s and early 2000s, graduating with a BFA from the Otago Polytechnic's School of Fine Art in 2000. He has held 16 solo shows in New Zealand, Australia, America and Europe.

Death, time and the shadow of history are recurring themes in Wheeler's art.

== Solo Shows ==
- 2000 Emerging Artist 2000, Centre of Contemporary Art, Christchurch, New Zealand
- 2001 Ill Strokes, High Street Project, Christchurch, New Zealand
- 2002 Disarticulated 2, Centre of Contemporary Art, Christchurch, New Zealand
- 2003 The Words of Wisdom are Heard in Quite, Timaru Public Art Gallery, Timaru, New Zealand, and Milford Galleries, Dunedin, New Zealand
- 2004 We will Shine Like Stars in the Summer Night, The Arthouse, Christchurch, New Zealand
- 2004 I Went Looking for One Good Man, Whitespace, Auckland, New Zealand
- 2004 Night of the Long Knives, Milford Galleries, Dunedin, New Zealand
- 2005 Citizen Artist, The Arthouse Christchurch, New Zealand
- 2005 Vitamin P, Mark Wolley Gallery, Portland, United States
- 2006 Don't Believe the Hype, Brooke Gifford Gallery, Christchurch, New Zealand
- 2006 Home Before Dark, Whitespace, Auckland, New Zealand
- 2007 History Will be Kind to Me, Brooke Gifford Gallery, Christchurch, New Zealand
- 2007 Losing the War on Images, Whitespace, Auckland, New Zealand
- 2007 Run Like Hell, Kolektiv Berlin, Berlin, Germany
