= Glenn Jonas =

New Zealand cricketer (born 1970)

Glenn Ralph Jonas (born 13 August 1970) is a former New Zealand cricketer who played first-class cricket for Wellington and Otago between the 1993–94 and 1999–00 seasons.

Jonas was born at Carterton in Wairarapa in 1970 and educated at Hutt Valley Memorial College.

After playing Hawke Cup matches for Hutt Valley from the 1990–91 season, Jonas first featured for Wellington's Second XI the following season. He made his senior representative debut for the provincial team in a December 1993 List A fixture against Auckland at the Basin Reserve, although he did not take a wicket. Hemade his first-class debut the following month against Otago, opening the bowling and taking four wickets. Primarily a right-arm medium pace bowler, Jonas played regularly for Wellington for five seasons before moving to Otago ahead of the 1998–99 season. He played for the team for two seasons as well as representing Dunedin Metropolitan in the Hawke Cup in the 1999–00 season.

In total Jonas played in 35 first-class matches, taking 132 wickets, and 64 List A matches, taking 92 wickets. As well as his two provincial teams, he played two first-class and one List A match for the New Zealand Cricket Academy during the 1994–95 season and one first-class and four List A matches for Central Conference during 1997–98.
