= Jason Wells (cricketer) =

New Zealand cricketer (born 1970)

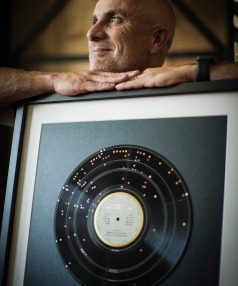

Jason Douglas Wells (born 25 March 1970) is a former New Zealand cricketer who played for the Wellington Firebirds and he also played for Wellington City which won the Hawke Cup in the 1997–98. He was born in Wellington.
