= 1977 in New Zealand television =

This is a list of New Zealand television-related events in 1977.

== Events ==
- The Governor, a six-part historical TV miniseries on Sir George Grey, screened in September and October.
- A television series about sheepdog trials A Dog's Show starts its broadcasting on TV One.

== Debuts ==
- Fair Go - consumer affairs show. TVNZ
- A Week of It - political satire. South Pacific Television

== Television shows ==
- No information on television shows this year.

== Ending this year ==
- Ngaio Marsh Theatre (TV series) (TV One) (1977)

== Births ==
- 13 November – Chanel Cole, New Zealand-Australian singer
- 15 December – Dominic Bowden, TV host
