= Margaret Keys =

Irish classical soprano

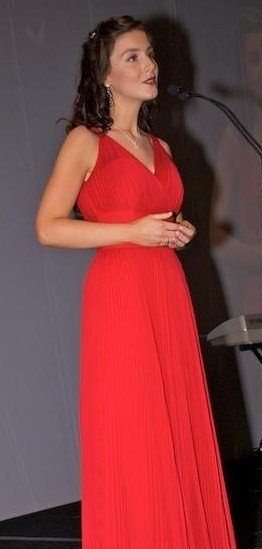

Background information
- Born: Margaret Keys; Derry, Northern Ireland
- Origin: Northern Ireland
- Genres: Classical crossover, musical theater
- Occupation: Singer
- Label: Universal

Margaret Keys is an Irish classical soprano.

== Biography ==
Keys was a primary school teacher for four years before taking a career break and entering the music industry. At the age of 15, Keys was awarded the Trinity College of Music London Medal for the best overall singer in her music examinations. She has a master's degree in Singing and Performance from the Royal Scottish Academy of Music and Drama.

She has performed in Ireland and the United Kingdom, North America and Australia. She has also participated in musical theater productions (including Broadway) and vocal workshops. Being the recipient of the New York Artist Award and the BBC Fame Academy Bursary, Keys has worked with acclaimed stars, producers and directors from Broadway, including Sir Andrew Lloyd Webber. Her musical theater repertoire includes, amongst others, Beauty and the Beast, Phantom of the Opera, My Fair Lady, Les Misérables, Mary Poppins and Carousel.

Keys performed for an audience of 35,000 at Rotorua Lakeside Concert. Her later performance at the National Concert Hall in Dublin was viewed favourable by the critics and resulted in the signing by Universal Records.

Keys released her first studio album, Legato, which debuted at number 14.

She has performed in the Royal Albert Hall and has toured with Alfie Boe, Russell Watson, Paul Potts, the Welsh Fron Male Voice Choir and performed in West End theatres. She performed during Pope Francis' first state visit to America in September 2015 and also for his private reception at Mansion House, Dublin. Keys made her debut at Carnegie Hall, New York, in December 2016 and Sunday Night at the London Palladium in 2017.

Margaret released her highly anticipated album "The Gift of Music" in June 2018. It soared straight to the top of the Official Classical and Classicfm charts, as the highest new entry, beating off competition from some of the world's most famous classical stars. She was also the first ever female performer from Ireland to ever enter the Official Classical Charts. Following this success she was invited to perform for The Royal Christmas Carol Concert at St James' palace for members of the royal family and 300 special guests.

== Philanthropy ==
She founded MKeys Productions where she produces and directs children's productions for charity. Keys is also an ambassador for the HRH Prince of Wales Foundation for Children and Arts.
