= Edith Louisa Niederer =

New Zealand farmer and community leader

Edith Louisa Niederer (1890–1973) was a New Zealand farmer and community leader.
