= Nikki Jenkins =

New Zealand artistic gymnast

- Full name: Nicola Michelle Jenkins
- Born: c. 1976 (age 49–50)

Gymnastics career
- Discipline: Women's artistic gymnastics
- Country represented: New Zealand; (1990)
- Club: North Shore Gym Club
- Retired: yes
Medal record
Representing New Zealand
Women's artistic gymnastics
Commonwealth Games
Gold medal – first place	1990 Auckland	Vault

Nicola Michelle Jenkins (born c. 1976) is a retired New Zealand artistic gymnast. Aged 14, she won gold at the 1990 Commonwealth Games, and she remains the youngest New Zealander to have won a gold medal at Commonwealth or Olympic Games.

Jenkins won the gold medal in the women's vault at the 1990 Commonwealth Games in Auckland. She had been considered an outsider at the event who was not expected to have a high placing. Consequently, she became the youngest New Zealander to win a gold medal at either the Commonwealth or Olympic Games. Jenkins was awarded the New Zealand 1990 Commemoration Medal.

Following the Games, Jenkins had increased demands from the media and expectations from the public. She was invited to a prestigious event in Russia and after that she prepared for the 1991 World Championships, where she intended to gain an individual qualification for the 1992 Summer Olympics in Barcelona, Spain. She contracted measles before the 1991 event and this meant that she could not compete. Moreover, all the competitors were required to be inoculated and this caused some suspicion amongst a few nations. This brought unwanted attention on New Zealand and Jenkins. Jenkins was unable to qualify for the Barcelona Olympics and continued with gymnastics, but her dream had come to an end and she eventually quit.

Jenkins studied physical education at the University of Otago, graduating with a Bachelor of Physical Education degree in 1999. Sources differ whether she has been teaching physical education at schools in Auckland, or whether she lives in Australia and is involved in performing arts.
