= Disappearance of Mona Blades =

New Zealand disappearance case

Mona Elizabeth Blades
- Born: 1956 or 1957; New Zealand
- Disappeared: 31 May 1975 (aged 18); Taupō
- Status: Missing for 51 years, 5 months and 17 days

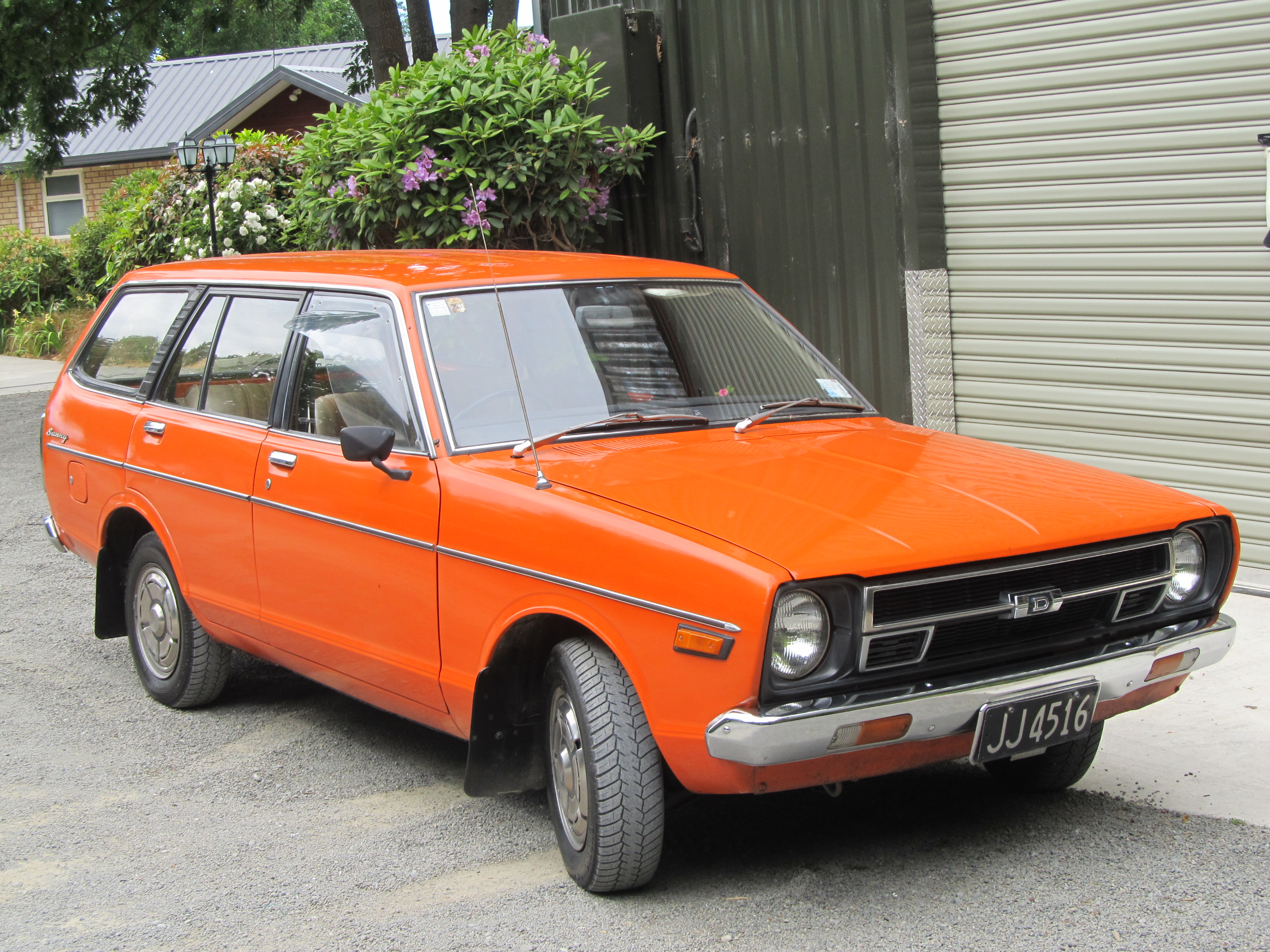
1979 Datsun Sunny Wagon similar to the one multiple witnesses saw Blades entering.

Mona Elizabeth Blades was an 18-year-old New Zealand woman who disappeared on 31 May 1975 while hitchhiking. Her body and belongings have never been found and no one has been charged in connection with her disappearance and presumed murder.

== Disappearance ==
Locations
1 10:00 A woman resembling Blades was sighted on the corner of Lake Terrace and Titiraupenga Street, Taupo. Around 10am a woman resembling Blades was seen entering an orange Datsun.
2 12:00-13:30 A woman resembling Blades was sighted by three independent eyewitnesses (one of whom spoke to her and she introduced herself by name) at Spa Hotel, Taupo. She was seen entering a red Toyota station wagon.

Blades was hitchhiking from Hamilton to Hastings on Saturday 31 May 1975, the first day of the Queen's Birthday long weekend, and was allegedly last seen on the Napier–Taupo Road in an orange Datsun 120Y station wagon. A truck driver reported that he had seen Blades getting into the Datsun, while others reported seeing a matching vehicle veering off the highway and stopping on rural Matea Road. As a result, police spent thousands of hours fruitlessly interviewing New Zealand's more than 500 orange Datsun owners.

== Investigation ==
There have been a number of suspects in the case. Auckland police investigated John Freeman who had rented an orange Datsun the weekend that Blades disappeared. On the day two weeks later that police announced they were searching for an orange Datsun, Freeman shot and wounded a student at St Cuthbert's College in Auckland before killing himself.

An elderly New Zealand man and Charlie Hughes, a Hamilton man now living in Australia, have remained "persons of interest" for police. Hughes has gone public in newspapers and on television about his frustrations at being on the suspects list and has denied he had anything to do with the alleged murder.

In 2003, police investigated a report that Blades' name had been found etched on a garage floor in a Huntly house, which the house's occupants feared might be a makeshift grave. It was discovered that the name had been inscribed on concrete as a joke six years earlier, and the former owner of the property apologised to her family.

In 2005, Blades' brother, Tony Blades, told the Daily Post his family had not talked to the media during the previous 30 years about their feelings because it was too hard on them, especially their mother, who was then in her 80s, and her father had died not knowing his daughter's whereabouts.

Former Kawerau policeman Tony Moller believed his ex-colleague, former traffic officer Derrick Hinton, was involved in Blades’ death. Moller's allegations have been strongly rejected by Hinton’s family. Based on those allegations, police in January 2012 used excavators to dig up the laundry floor of a Kawerau property where Hinton lived in the 1970s but found nothing of interest.

== Aftermath ==
The Mona Blades case featured on TVNZ's Cold Case programme in July 2018. The programme revisited the case with expert detectives and re-examined the original files hoping to find new leads. The experts concluded that the original investigation focused too heavily on the hunt for the orange Datsun and may have misled potential witnesses by using photographs which did not resemble Blades' hairstyle at the time of her disappearance. A detective said that gang members or their associates may have been involved in the disappearance. Blades had gang affiliations, and gang members may have been travelling on the road to a gathering in Wellington that weekend.

== See also ==
- List of people who disappeared mysteriously: post-1970
