= Edgar Benyon =

New Zealand magician, juggler, entertainer

Edgar Wilson Benyon (29 March 1901–14 September 1978) was a New Zealand magician, juggler and entertainer. He was born in Auckland, New Zealand on 29 March 1901.

In 1969 the Variety Artists Club of New Zealand Inc created an award in his honour. Named the Benny Award, it is the highest honour available to a New Zealand variety entertainer.

Benyon was the first recipient of the Grand Master of Magic Award from the Brotherhood of Auckland Magicians in 1969.
