= Murray Burdan =

New Zealand swimmer

Medal record

Representing New Zealand

Men's swimming

World Championships (SC)
Gold medal – first place	1995 Rio de Janeiro	4x100m Medley

Murray William Burdan (born 2 May 1975 in Lower Hutt) is a former freestyle and butterfly swimmer from New Zealand, who competed at the 1996 Summer Olympics in Atlanta, United States, for his native country. His biggest success came in 1995, at the second edition of the FINA World SC Championships in Rio de Janeiro, Brazil, where Burdan won the gold medal with the Men's 4x100 Medley Relay Team. This was a New Zealand record time and was the 4th fastest time ever recorded swimming achievements. He became the coach of a North Wellington Junior Football Club team called the Lightning Bolts.
