= Test Pictures =

- Directed by: Geoff Steven; Denis Taylor; Philip Dadson
- Written by: Denis Taylor
- Produced by: Erik Braithwaite; Geoff Chapple; Denis Taylor; Don Whyte
- Starring: Denis Taylor; Lee Feltham
- Cinematography: Geoff Steven
- Edited by: Geoff Steven
- Production company: Hinge Film Productions
- Release date: 1975
- Running time: 83 min
- Country: New Zealand
- Language: English
- Budget: $14,000

Test Pictures, subtitled Eleven Vignettes from a Relationship, is a 1975 New Zealand experimental film showing the failure of a rural commune. It had its world premiere at the Wellington Film Festival.

Test Pictures was filmed at Hinge Estate in Huia in 1973 with a budget of $14,000. Cast and crew worked for free and lived communally on site. In order to screen the film the Wellington Film Society paid $500 to create a screening print which was shown at their Wellington Film Festival. It was then screened at the Auckland International Film Festival in July. Director Geoff Stevens says that the audiences were left "perplexed" by the film. A screening at Iran's ABU-SHIRAZ Film Maker's Festival followed later that year.

== Cast ==
- Denis Taylor as Man - Nick
- Lee Feltham as Woman - Lindy
- Francis Halpin as Master of Ceremonies
- Moira Turner as Pianist
- Geoff Barlow as Roadworker
- Dora Warren as Roadworker's Mother
- Barbara Saipe as Young Girl
- Mark Elmore as Young Boy
- Mike Fitzgerald as Storekeeper

== Reception ==
Sam Edwards in the book New Zealand film, 1912–1996 says "Even as an example of experimental cinema, it was not particularly successful, and occasionally feels cumbersome and self-conscious. At the same time, the impetus it gave film-makers as a result of its co-operative base in Alternative Cinema, and the opportunity it provided for exploring the medium, was to have a significant catalystic effect."
