= Dave McKenzie (runner) =

New Zealand long-distance runner

David Closs McKenzie (born 16 March 1943 in Dunollie, Grey District) is a former long-distance runner from New Zealand. McKenzie won the Boston Marathon in 1967, setting a new course record of 2 hours 15 minutes 45 seconds. He was the first New Zealander to win the Boston Marathon.

A 24-year-old printer with the Greymouth Evening Star at the time, he lived in Rūnanga on the West Coast. McKenzie had won eight of his 10 previous marathons and was voted West Coast Sportsman of the Year for two successive years. Described as "diminutive, McKenzie is 5 feet, 4 inches in height, weighing only 8 stone, 8 pounds."

McKenzie represented New Zealand in the men's marathon at two consecutive Summer Olympics, starting in Mexico City (1968).

== Achievements ==
- All results regarding marathon, unless stated otherwise

Year	Competition	Venue	Position	Notes
Representing New Zealand
1967	Boston Marathon	Boston, United States	1st	2:15:45

Awards
Preceded by Valerie Young	Lonsdale Cup of the New Zealand Olympic Committee; 1967	Succeeded by Ian Ballinger
