= Benny Award =

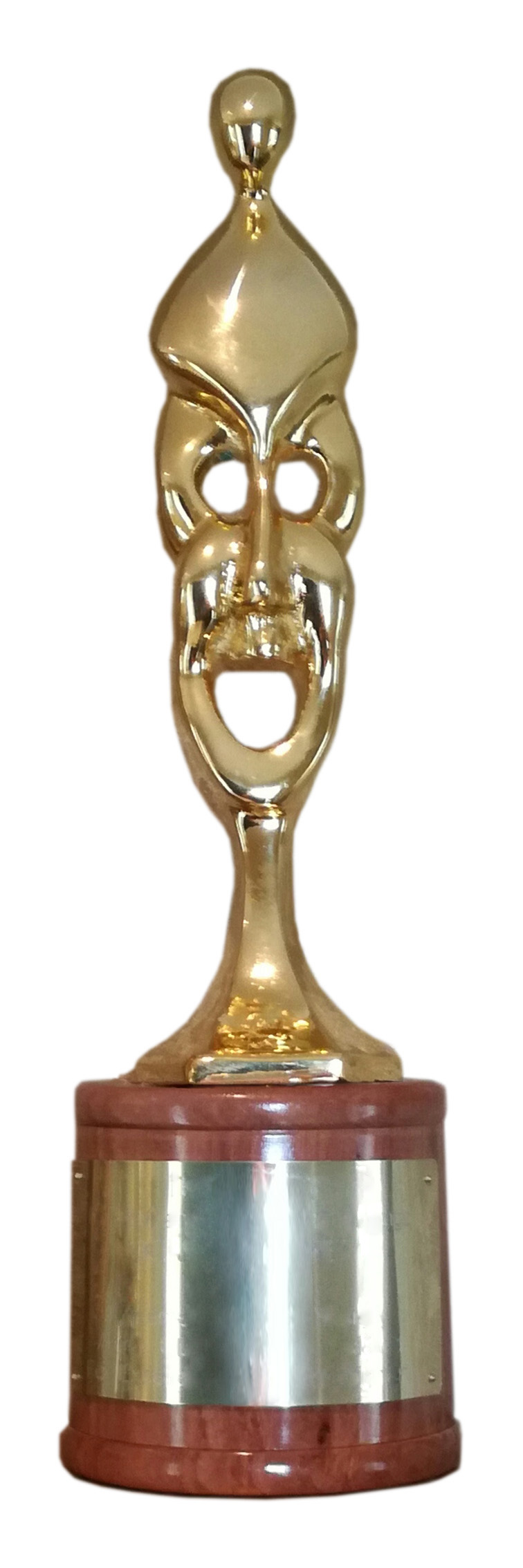
- Benny Award
- Awarded for: A lifetime of excellence in variety entertainment
- Date: 1969
- Country: New Zealand
- Website: http://www.vac.org.nz

The Benny Award is bestowed on a New Zealand variety entertainer. It is presented annually by the Variety Artists Club of New Zealand, a non-for-profit organisation and showbusiness club, founded in 1966 and awarded to a variety performer who has achieved "A lifetime of excellence in their field of the performing arts".

== Nominations ==
Nominations for the Benny Award are accepted from VAC members and the recipient decided upon by past Benny recipients, making its presentation recognition of the highest degree by the New Zealand entertainment industry.

== Naming ==
The Benny Award was named after its first recipient, New Zealand variety performer Edgar Benyon (1902–1978) in 1969. The Benny statuette was designed and sculptured by magician Jon Zealando and features Greek muses Melpomene and Thalia, the traditional symbols of comedy and tragedy.

Recipients of the Benny Award include many New Zealand household names and figureheads of entertainment.

== Recipients ==
Year	Recipient
1969	Edgar Benyon
1970	Howard Morrison
1970	Oswald Cheesman
1971	Pat McMinn
1972	Jon Zealando
1973	Ray Columbus
1974	Les Andrews
1974	Peter Newberry
1974	John Rowles
1975	Phil Warren
1976	Rusty Greaves
1976	Merv Smith
1977	Max Cryer
1978	George Tumahai
1979	Chic Littlewood
1980	Peter Evans
1980	Eddie Hegan
1981	Marcus Craig
1982	Don Linden
1983	Russell Middlebrook
1984	John Maybury Sr.
1985	Toni Savage
1986	Johnny Bond
1987	Silvio De Pra
1988	Ricky May
1988	Alma Woods
1989	Sylvia Rielly
1990	Billy T. James
1991	Debbie Dorday
1992	Carl Doy
1993	Rob Guest
1993	Mary Throll
1994	Rena Owen
1995	Guy Cater
1996	Keith Leggett
1997	Paul Bennett
1998	Malvina Major
1999	Gerry Merito
2000	Doug Aston
2001	Gray Bartlett
2002	Tom Sharplin
2003	Jim Joll
2004	Eldred Stebbing
2005	Elaine Bracey
2006	Alan Watson
2007	Ray Woolf
2008	Suzanne Lynch
2009	Eddie Low
2010	Gary Daverne
2011	Shane Hales
2012	Marian Burns
2013	Larry Morris
2014	Tina Cross
2015	Johnny Devlin
2016	Suzanne Prentice
2017	Kevin Greaves
2018	Brendan Dugan
2019	Dennis Marsh
2022	Chris Powley
2023	Jodi Vaughn
2024	Jackie Clarke
2024	Frankie Stevens
2025	Dinah Lee
2026	David Hartnell MNZM
