= Public broadcasting in New Zealand =

Public broadcasting in New Zealand is funded through New Zealand Government body New Zealand On Air, and consists of a number of television channels, radio stations, and websites. In addition to funding solely public media outlets, New Zealand On Air also funds the production of New Zealand content which is broadcast or disseminated through commercial means.

== Television ==
Historically, public broadcasting in television has been achieved through Government-owned Television New Zealand channels. However, over time public broadcasting funding has become separated from the Government-owned broadcaster, such that NZOA-funded content is broadcast on a number of channels.

Unlike most public television broadcasters overseas, public television in New Zealand is also supported by advertising. The first television advertisements screened in April 1961, at which time television had only been broadcasting for ten months and was only available in Auckland.

=== Maori Television ===
In 2004, Māori Television was established as a publicly funded channel with the purpose of promoting the Māori language.

=== TVNZ 7 ===
TVNZ 7 was a commercial-free television channel which was created by the Fifth Labour Government.

== Radio ==
Radio New Zealand is the main public broadcast in radio, providing commercial-free Radio New Zealand National and Radio New Zealand Concert.

== See also ==
- Media of New Zealand
- Television in New Zealand
- List of radio stations in New Zealand
- Radio New Zealand
