= Variety Artists Club of New Zealand =

Not-for-profit organisation in New Zealand

Variety Artists Club of New Zealand Inc
- Abbreviation: VAC
- Formation: 1966
- Type: Not-for-profit society
- Website: http://www.vac.org.nz

The Variety Artists Club of New Zealand Inc (VAC) is a non-for-profit organisation and show business club. It was founded in 1966 and became an incorporated society in 1972. The VAC was formed to promote goodwill within the New Zealand entertainment industry and foster a spirit of loyalty, friendship and cooperation between members. Each year the VAC presents a number of New Zealand entertainment awards including the prestigious Benny Award.

== Formation and history ==
The Variety Artists Club of New Zealand Incorporated (VAC) was formed in 1966 with the name of The Variety Artists Convention. Founder members include Les Andrews QSM, Edgar and Doris Benyon, Dave Cowel, Peter Evans, Eddie and Elaine Hegan, Chic Littlewood, Pat McMinn OBE, Simon Mehana, Sally Metzger, Peter Newberry, Mary Throll, George Tumahai and Jon Zealando. The name was changed to The Variety Artists Club in 1968. In 1972 the club became an incorporated society. The same year the VAC Benevolent Fund was established to serve as an aid to variety performers who were experiencing financial hardship.

== Membership ==
Membership in the VAC is open to those with a link to the entertainment industry. Members include actors, comedians, composers, magicians, musicians, screenwriters, singers, speakers and other variety performers. Theatrical agents and technicians also make up the membership.

== Patrons ==
Patrons of the VAC are NZ Journalist and Media Personality David Hartnell MNZM and Gray Bartlett MBE.

Founding President Lou Clauson QSM was a patron of the club until his death in 2013. Dame Thea Muldoon, the wife of former New Zealand Prime Minister, Sir Robert Muldoon was Patron until her death in 2015.

== Awards ==
Each year the VAC presents prestigious awards to those involved with the entertainment industry.

The Benny Awards remain the only national honours recognising and celebrating artists across all genres and fields of entertainment in NZ.

The Benny Award is the highest honour that can be bestowed to a New Zealand variety entertainer. It is presented annually to a variety artist who has achieved a lifetime of excellence in their field of the performing arts. It was first presented to legendary New Zealand variety performer Edgar Benyon (1902–1978) in 1969. Recipients of the Benny Award include many New Zealand household names and figureheads of entertainment.
