= 1836 in New Zealand =

- Decades: 1810s; 1820s; 1830s; 1840s; 1850s
- See also: History of New Zealand; List of years in New Zealand; Timeline of New Zealand history

The following lists events that happened during 1836 in New Zealand.

== Incumbents ==
=== Regal and viceregal ===
- Head of State – King William IV
- Governor of New South Wales – Major-General Sir Richard Bourke

=== Government and law ===
- British Resident in New Zealand – James Busby
- Additional British Resident in New Zealand – Thomas McDonnell until his resignation in July.

== Events ==
- July
  - – Additional British Resident in New Zealand, Thomas McDonnell resigns.
- 26 December – John Hughes, W.I. Haberfield and others from the Weller brothers whaling station at Otakou arrive in the Magnet and set up a whaling station on the north side of Moeraki Point.

Undated

- Captain John Howell is sent by whaler and merchant Johnny Jones to establish a whaling station at Riverton to replace that recently abandoned at Preservation Inlet. (see also 1829 and 1835)
- The Stone Store at Kerikeri, the oldest stone building in New Zealand, is completed mid-year.
- Late in the year Alfred Nesbitt Brown closes the mission at Matamata. (see also 1835 & 1838)

== Births ==
- 14 January (in England): Thomas Hocken, collector and bibliographer.

Unknown date

(in Ireland) Richard Reeves, politician.

== See also ==
- List of years in New Zealand
- Timeline of New Zealand history
- History of New Zealand
- Military history of New Zealand
- Timeline of the New Zealand environment
- Timeline of New Zealand's links with Antarctica
