= 1835 in New Zealand =

- Decades: 1810s; 1820s; 1830s; 1840s; 1850s
- See also: History of New Zealand; List of years in New Zealand; Timeline of New Zealand history

The following lists events that happened during 1835 in New Zealand.

== Incumbents ==
=== Regal and viceregal ===
- Head of State – King William IV
- Governor of New South Wales – Major-General Sir Richard Bourke

=== Government and law ===
- British Resident in New Zealand – James Busby
- Additional British Resident in New Zealand – Thomas McDonnell.

== Events ==
- January
  - - William Colenso sets up the first printing press in New Zealand.
- 17 February - William Colenso produces the first book in New Zealand, The Epistle to the Philippians and the Ephesians, in Māori.
- 22 April: Wesleyan Missionaries extend south beyond their main base at Hokianga to the Waikato Coast, among them James and Mary Wallis.
- 28 July - Joseph Brooks Weller, eldest of the Weller brothers, dies of tuberculosis at Otakou.
- July
  - – Thomas McDonnell, newly appointed Additional British Resident in New Zealand, returns to New Zealand.
- 28 October – James Busby drafts the Declaration of Independence of New Zealand in conjunction with the United Tribes of New Zealand which is signed by 34 (or 35) northern chiefs (and later by another 18). A copy is sent to King William IV.
- October - First printing in English in New Zealand made by William Colenso, a notice warning against French influence in New Zealand.
- 19 December – HMS Beagle, captained by Robert FitzRoy and carrying Charles Darwin, arrives in New Zealand.
- 30 December – The Beagle leaves New Zealand.

Undated

- Early in the year Alfred Nesbitt Brown opens the mission at Matamata. (see also 1833, 1834 & 1836)
- Johnny Jones and Edwin Palmer buy the whaling station at Preservation Inlet but it closes within a year. (see also 1829 & 1836)
- French whaling captain Jean Langlois visits Akaroa for the first time.
- The Anglican mission at Te Papa peninsula, Tauranga, opens. (see also 1837 & 1838)
- There are approximately 80 Europeans at the Weller brothers whaling station at Otakou.
- There are several traders in the Bay of Plenty including Phillip Tapsell and James Farrow.
- Fighting between Te Arawa and Ngaiterangi against Waikato tribes.

== Sport ==
=== Cricket ===
- December – Charles Darwin witnesses a game of cricket at the Bay of Islands.

== Births ==
- 24 February (in London): Julius Vogel, 8th Prime Minister of New Zealand.
- 19 June (in France): Suzanne Aubert, Catholic missionary.

== See also ==
- List of years in New Zealand
- Timeline of New Zealand history
- History of New Zealand
- Military history of New Zealand
- Timeline of the New Zealand environment
- Timeline of New Zealand's links with Antarctica
