= 1834 in New Zealand =

- Decades: 1810s; 1820s; 1830s; 1840s; 1850s
- See also: History of New Zealand; List of years in New Zealand; Timeline of New Zealand history

The following lists events that happened during 1834 in New Zealand.

== Incumbents ==
=== Regal and viceregal ===
- Head of State – King William IV
- Governor of New South Wales – Major-General Sir Richard Bourke

=== Government and law ===
- British Resident in New Zealand – James Busby

== Events ==
- March
  - – James Busby convenes a meeting of Māori chiefs from northern New Zealand. They will become the United Tribes of New Zealand.
- 9 March or 20 March – The United Tribes of New Zealand choose a design for their flag.
- 30 December – William Colenso, printer/missionary for the Church Missionary Society, arrives at Paihia in the Bay of Islands.

Undated

- The house for James Busby is completed. After the signing of the Treaty of Waitangi there in 1840 it will be known as the Treaty House.
- Late in the year a site is chosen for a mission at Matamata by Alfred Nesbitt Brown and William Williams. (see also 1833 & 1835)
- The establishment of the Anglican mission at Te Papa peninsula, Tauranga, is begun late in the year.
- While in England, Thomas McDonnell is appointed Additional British Resident in New Zealand (or early 1835)
- Two Māori converts returning from the Bay of Islands introduce Christianity to Gisborne. (see also 1838)

== Births ==
- 14 February (in England): William Odgers R.N., Victoria Cross recipient.
- 16 March (in Scotland): James Hector, geologist.

Undated

- Malcolm Fraser, surveyor.

Approximate

- Alfred Henry Burton, photographer.

== See also ==
- List of years in New Zealand
- Timeline of New Zealand history
- History of New Zealand
- Military history of New Zealand
- Timeline of the New Zealand environment
- Timeline of New Zealand's links with Antarctica
