= 1833 in New Zealand =

- Decades: 1810s; 1820s; 1830s; 1840s; 1850s
- See also: History of New Zealand; List of years in New Zealand; Timeline of New Zealand history

The following lists events that happened during 1833 in New Zealand.

== Incumbents ==
=== Regal and viceregal ===
- Head of State – King William IV
- Governor of New South Wales – Major-General Sir Richard Bourke

=== Government and law ===
- British Resident in New Zealand – James Busby

== Events ==
- 10 May – James Busby arrives in the Bay of Islands on HMS Imogene.
- 16 May – James Busby meets 22 leading chiefs at Paihia and reads them a message from King William IV.
- October/November
  - – Alfred Nesbitt Brown along with Henry Williams, John Morgan and William Fairburn visit the Thames Valley and reach Matamata.(see also 1834 & 1835)
- November/December
  - – A mission is established at Puriri.

=== Undated ===
- The building of the house for James Busby is begun. After the signing of the Treaty of Waitangi there in 1840 it will be known as the Treaty House.
- The keystone above the door of the Stone Store in Kerikeri is carved.
- Late in the year Louisa, daughter of John and Betty Guard, is born at Port Underwood. She is the first female European child born in the South Island.

== Births ==
- 1 January (in Scotland): Robert Lawson, architect.
- 27 January (in Australia): William Larnach, businessman, politician.
- 31 May (in Scotland): David Boyle, 7th Earl of Glasgow, 14th Governor of New Zealand.
- 14 September (in Scotland): John Bryce, politician.
- 23 September (in England): William Hodgkins, artist and art historian.
- 20 October (in England): Arthur Atkinson, politician.
- undated (in Hokitika): Richard Hobbs, politician.

== See also ==
- List of years in New Zealand
- Timeline of New Zealand history
- History of New Zealand
- Military history of New Zealand
- Timeline of the New Zealand environment
- Timeline of New Zealand's links with Antarctica
