= 1830 in New Zealand =

- Decades: 1810s; 1820s; 1830s; 1840s; 1850s
- See also: History of New Zealand; List of years in New Zealand; Timeline of New Zealand history

The following lists events that happened during 1830 in New Zealand.

== Incumbents ==
=== Regal and viceregal ===
- Head of State – King George IV dies on 26 June and is succeeded by his brother King William IV.
- Governor of New South Wales – General Ralph Darling

== Events ==
- 10 January – The first whaling ship, the Antarctic, enters Lyttelton Harbour, which Captain Morell calls 'Cook's Harbour'.
- 3 February – John Guard arrives in Sydney with a cargo of whale oil, the first to be shipped from the South Island.
- 21 April – Phillip Tapsell is married to Karuhi, sister of a Ngā Puhi chief, by Samuel Marsden.
- 31 July – William Yate returns from 6 months 'training' in printing at Sydney with a printing press. His attempts at printing are not particularly successful. (see also 1834 & 1835)
- 19 August – Captain William Stewart leaves for Kapiti Island, where Te Rauparaha has promised him a cargo of flax in return for transporting a large Ngāti Toa party to Akaroa.
- 26 October – Te Rauparaha and 120 Ngāti Toa warriors leave Kapiti Island for Akaroa on the hired brig Elizabeth.
- 6 November – After 3 or 4 days hidden aboard the Elizabeth while anchored in Akaroa, Te Rauparaha and his warriors attack and massacre a village of local Kāi Tahu, and then cannibalise them.
- November
  - Phillip Tapsell settles in Maketu in the Bay of Plenty and begins trading for flax. (see also 1828)

Undated

- John Guard marries Elizabeth 'Betty' Parker in Sydney. She leaves Sydney on the schooner Waterloo on 7 November, arrives at Te Awaiti before the end of the year, and is the first European women to settle permanently in the South Island.
- A whaling station is operating from Porirua.
- Jack Duff, a trader, is the first known European to visit the Palmerston North area. He travels by whaleboat up river as far inland as Woodville and returns to Porirua.
- The first inland mission is started at Waimate North.

== Births ==
- 2 May (in Ireland): Maurice O'Rorke, politician.
- 29 August (in Ireland): Charles Bowen, politician.
- 22 October (in Scotland): Arthur John Burns, businessman and politician.

Unknown date

- (in England): Edwin Blake, Member of Parliament
- (in Ireland): Charles Bowen, politician.
- (in England): Henry Miller, politician.
- (in Ireland) Thomas Russell, founder of the Bank of New Zealand

== See also ==
- List of years in New Zealand
- Timeline of New Zealand history
- History of New Zealand
- Military history of New Zealand
- Timeline of the New Zealand environment
- Timeline of New Zealand's links with Antarctica
