= 1832 in New Zealand =

- Decades: 1810s; 1820s; 1830s; 1840s; 1850s
- See also: History of New Zealand; List of years in New Zealand; Timeline of New Zealand history

The following lists events that happened during 1832 in New Zealand.

== Incumbents ==
=== Regal and viceregal ===
- Head of State – King William IV
- Governor of New South Wales – Major-General Sir Richard Bourke

=== Government and law ===
- British Resident in New Zealand – James Busby is appointed in March but does not arrive in New Zealand until 10 May 1833.

== Events ==
- 19 April – Construction of the Stone Store at Kerikeri begins.
- December – Missionary Henry Williams records the first mention of cricket being played in New Zealand, on the beach at Paihia.

=== Undated ===
- The Weller brothers whaling station at Otakou is destroyed by fire before whaling operations have begun. It is soon rebuilt. (see 1831 & 1835)
- Ngāti Toa under chief and war leader Te Rauparaha capture and destroy the Ngāi Tahu stronghold of Kaiapoi pa.
- Te Rauparaha and Ngāti Toa capture the Ngāi Tahu pā at Onawe on Akaroa harbour and massacre the inhabitants.
- Ngā Puhi attack Otumoetai pā.
- British merchant and ship owner Captain James Clendon buys land and sets up a trading station at Okiato in the Bay of Islands. The location would be renamed Russell and become the first capital of New Zealand in 1840.

== Births ==
- 14 March (in Scotland): Sir James Fergusson, 6th Baronet, 6th Governor of New Zealand.
- 20 November William Gilbert Mair, soldier and judge

Unknown date

- Frederic Jones, politician.
- (in England): John Davies Ormond, politician.
- Elizabeth Mary Palmer, New Zealand music and singing teacher, performer, composer, and entertainment promoter.
- Arthur Seymour, politician, Superintendent of Marlborough.
- Alexander Sligo, politician.
- Thomas Thompson, politician.

Approximate

- Te Kooti, Māori leader, religion founder and guerilla.

== Deaths ==
- 6 August: Thomas Kendall, Missionary and Pākehā Māori

== See also ==
- List of years in New Zealand
- Timeline of New Zealand history
- History of New Zealand
- Military history of New Zealand
- Timeline of the New Zealand environment
- Timeline of New Zealand's links with Antarctica
