= 1842 in New Zealand =

- Decades: 1820s; 1830s; 1840s; 1850s; 1860s
- See also: History of New Zealand; List of years in New Zealand; Timeline of New Zealand history

The following lists events that happened during 1842 in New Zealand.

== Population ==
The estimated population of New Zealand at the end of 1842 is 76,900 Māori and 10,992 non-Māori (a 120% increase in 1 year).

== Incumbents ==
=== Regal and viceregal ===
- Head of State – Queen Victoria
- Governor – Captain William Hobson dies on 10 September. His replacement Captain Robert Fitzroy does not arrive until 26 December 1843.

=== Government and law ===
- Chief Justice – William Martin

=== Main centre leaders ===
- Mayor of Wellington – George Hunter is elected Mayor on 3 October, the first Mayor in New Zealand. (see also 1843)

== Events ==
- 1 January: The Government begins publication of a monthly magazine in Māori, Te Karere o Nui Tireni (The Messenger of New Zealand). It publishes until 1846, and is revived as The Maori Messenger and Te Manuhiri Tuarangi between 1849 and 1863.
- 1 February: The first settlers arrive in Nelson aboard the Fifeshire.
- 24 February: The Bay of Islands Observer begins publishing. The newspaper publishes its last issue on 27 October 1842.
- 12 March: The Nelson Examiner and New Zealand Chronicle is first published. It continues until 1874.
- 6 April: The New Zealand Herald and Auckland Gazette, which was founded in 1841, ceases publication.
- April: The Auckland Standard begins publication. It folds on 28 August, after four months.
- May : Wellington becomes a Borough.
- 2 August: The New Zealand Colonist and Port Nicholson Advertiser begins publishing. It lasts for one year.
- 29 August: The Auckland Times begins publication. It runs until 1846.

=== Undated ===
- Copper is discovered on Kawau Island and a mine established.

== Sport ==
=== Cricket ===
The first recorded game in Wellington is played in December.

=== Horse racing ===
- 20 October – Races are held on the beach at Petone.

== Births ==
- (unknown date): (in Auckland) Isa Outhwaite, watercolour artist, poet, social activist and philanthropist
- 7 August: (in the Hutt Valley) Edward Riddiford, runholder
- 25 November: William Downie Stewart, politician
- (unknown date): Charles Rous-Marten, journalist and railway writer (in England)

== Deaths ==
- 7 March: Wiremu Kingi Maketu, first person executed in New Zealand under British rule
- 5 June: Charles Armitage Brown, pioneer New Plymouth businessman
- 10 September: William Hobson, first Governor of New Zealand
- 22 November: Te Kakapi-o-te-rangi Te Wharepouri, tribal leader

=== Unknown date ===
- Te Purewa, tribal leader

== See also ==
- List of years in New Zealand
- Timeline of New Zealand history
- History of New Zealand
- Military history of New Zealand
- Timeline of the New Zealand environment
- Timeline of New Zealand's links with Antarctica
