= 1831 in New Zealand =

- Decades: 1810s; 1820s; 1830s; 1840s; 1850s
- See also: History of New Zealand; List of years in New Zealand; Timeline of New Zealand history

The following lists events that happened during 1831 in New Zealand.

== Incumbents ==
=== Regal and viceregal ===
- Head of State – King William IV
- Governor of New South Wales – Major-General Sir Richard Bourke succeeds General Ralph Darling on 22 October

== Events ==
- 14 January – Traders led by Joe Rowe are the first non-Māori to visit the Wanganui area. The party includes Rowe, Andrew Powers, a man named Tom, and an African or African-American sailor.
- 16 April – Trade in preserved Māori heads as curios is outlawed by the Governor of New South Wales.
- 1 October – John and Betty Guard's son, John Guard, is born at his father's whaling station at Te Awaiti in Tory Channel. He is the first European child born in the South Island.
- 11 October – The first marriage between two Europeans in New Zealand is performed at Waimate North. William Gilbert Puckey marries Mathilda Davis.
- November
  - – The Weller brothers return (see below) in the Lucy Ann and establish a whaling station at Otakou.
- 25 December – John Guard Junior baptised in Sydney. (see above)

Undated

- Joseph Brooks Weller commissions a vessel from shipbuilders on Stewart Island.
- Joseph Brooks Weller arrives in Otago Harbour on the Sir George Murray and makes an agreement with local Māori claiming territory for King William IV before returning to Sydney.
- Ngāti Toa under chief and war leader Te Rauparaha besiege Ngāi Tahu stronghold of Kaiapoi pā.

== Births ==
- 8 January (in England): William Garden Cowie, first Anglican bishop of Auckland.
- 19 September (in England): William Rolleston, politician.
- 1 November (in England): Henry Albert (Harry) Atkinson, 10th premier of New Zealand.
- 24 November (in Dublin): Rose Whitty, convent founder.

== See also ==
- List of years in New Zealand
- Timeline of New Zealand history
- History of New Zealand
- Military history of New Zealand
- Timeline of the New Zealand environment
- Timeline of New Zealand's links with Antarctica
