= 1829 in New Zealand =

- Decades: 1800s; 1810s; 1820s; 1830s; 1840s
- See also: History of New Zealand; List of years in New Zealand; Timeline of New Zealand history

The following lists events that happened during 1829 in New Zealand.

== Incumbents ==
=== Regal and viceregal ===
- Head of State – King George IV
- Governor of New South Wales – General Ralph Darling

== Events ==
- 29 November – Alfred Nesbitt Brown arrives in Paihia. He is the third ordained minister in New Zealand.

Undated

- James Farrow, the first trader known to have frequented the Tauranga area, arrives for the first time. (see also 1838)
- A whaling station is established at Preservation Inlet on the south-west corner of the South Island by Captain William Anglem.

== Births ==
- 14 February (in England): Richard Burgess, murderer.
- 31 March (in England): Maria Rye, social reformer.
- 30 April (in Germany): Ferdinand von Hochstetter, geologist.
- 22 July: William Leonard Williams, Māori language scholar and Bishop of Waiapu.
- 26 November (in England): Arthur Hamilton-Gordon, 1st Baron Stanmore, Governor of New Zealand.

Undated

- Frederick Joseph Moss, politician.
- (in England): Henry Richmond, Superintendent of Taranaki.

== See also ==
- List of years in New Zealand
- Timeline of New Zealand history
- History of New Zealand
- Military history of New Zealand
- Timeline of the New Zealand environment
- Timeline of New Zealand's links with Antarctica
