= 1837 in New Zealand =

- Decades: 1810s; 1820s; 1830s; 1840s; 1850s
- See also: History of New Zealand; List of years in New Zealand; Timeline of New Zealand history

The following lists events that happened during 1837 in New Zealand.

== Incumbents ==
=== Regal and viceregal ===
- Head of State – King William IV dies on 20 June and is succeeded by Queen Victoria.
- Governor of New South Wales – The term of office of Major-General Sir Richard Bourke ends. His replacement, Sir George Gipps, is appointed Governor on 5 October but does not arrive in Sydney until 23 February 1838.

=== Government and law ===
- British Resident in New Zealand – James Busby

== Events ==
- 7 February – Samuel Marsden arrives in New Zealand on his last visit.
- 19 March – The first permanent European settlement in Canterbury. Prussian whaling captain George Hempleman (var. Hemplemann) establishes a whaling station at Peraki Bay, Banks Peninsula. Hempleman and his wife are the first German settlers in New Zealand.
- 22 March – ?Captain Clayton arranges the purchase of land for 3 miles inland of Peraki Bay.
- 4 July – Samuel Marsden leaves New Zealand for the final time.
- 21 October – Captain Clayton extends his 'purchase' to include all of Banks Peninsula.
- 24 October – George Hempleman occupies Peraki Bay under licence from Clayton. Later, after Clayton leaves for Sydney, Hempleman is forces to make further payments for the right to occupy the land. (for the occupation at Peraki Bay see History of Canterbury, New Zealand#Whalers and sealers)
- December
  - – The New Zealand Association is offered a Royal charter to take responsibility for the administration of New Zealand. (see also 1838, February)
- 30 December – William Colenso completes the New Testament in Māori. He produces 5000 copies of this edition.

Undated

- The New Zealand Association is formed.
- The Anglican mission at Tauranga closes because of intertribal Maori wars. (see also 1835 & 1838)
- Joseph Price, a representative of the Weller brothers, sets up a whaling station at Patiti Point, Timaru . (other sources suggest 1839)

== Births ==
=== Unknown date ===
- William Walker, politician.

== See also ==
- List of years in New Zealand
- Timeline of New Zealand history
- History of New Zealand
