= Agnes Busby =

Scottish settler in Australia and New Zealand

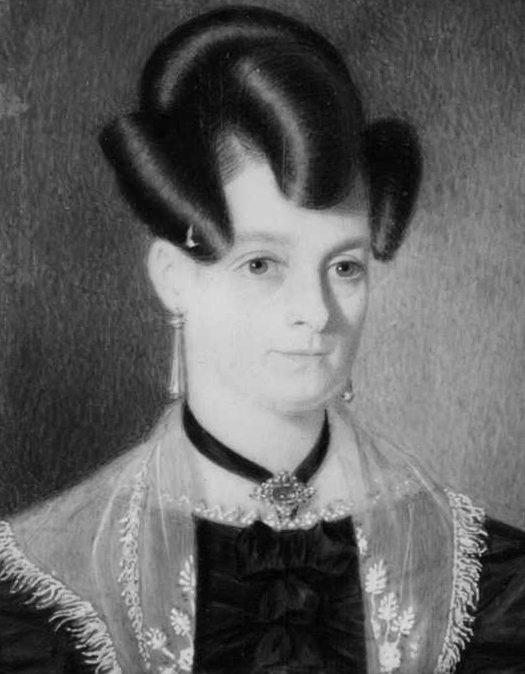
- Born: Agnes Dow c. 1800; Scotland
- Died: 13 October 1889 (aged 88–89); Pakaraka, New Zealand
- Known for: Contribution to early development of a British community in the Bay of Islands, New Zealand
- Spouse: James Busby (m. 1832; d. 1871)

Agnes Busby (c. 1800 – 13 October 1889) was an early European settler in Australia and New Zealand married to James Busby, the first British Resident of New Zealand.

== Early life ==
Agnes Busby (née Dow) was born to John and Jessie (née Campbell) Dow in Scotland in 1800 and emigrated to the Hunter River area of New South Wales in 1830 with her parents, her brother John, and her sister Susannah. At a party at Potts Point, Sydney, she met James Busby, and in November 1832 they married at Segenhoe in the Hunter Region.

== Life in New Zealand ==
In 1833, James Busby was appointed the British Resident of New Zealand, and he and Agnes moved to Waitangi to take up the position. He arrived in May and she in July 1833, already some months pregnant. They arrived to a poor situation: the house was "ruinous"; there were problems with hiring domestic staff; supplies of household goods were limited and deliveries infrequent, and Waitangi itself was an isolated outpost. In fact, the house was in such a poor state that the Busbys moved out to stay with the missionary Henry Williams for several months while workers repaired it, returning in January 1834. In letters to his family at this time, Busby described his wife's life as "slavish": "I often think she is a little lonely here, although she never complains".

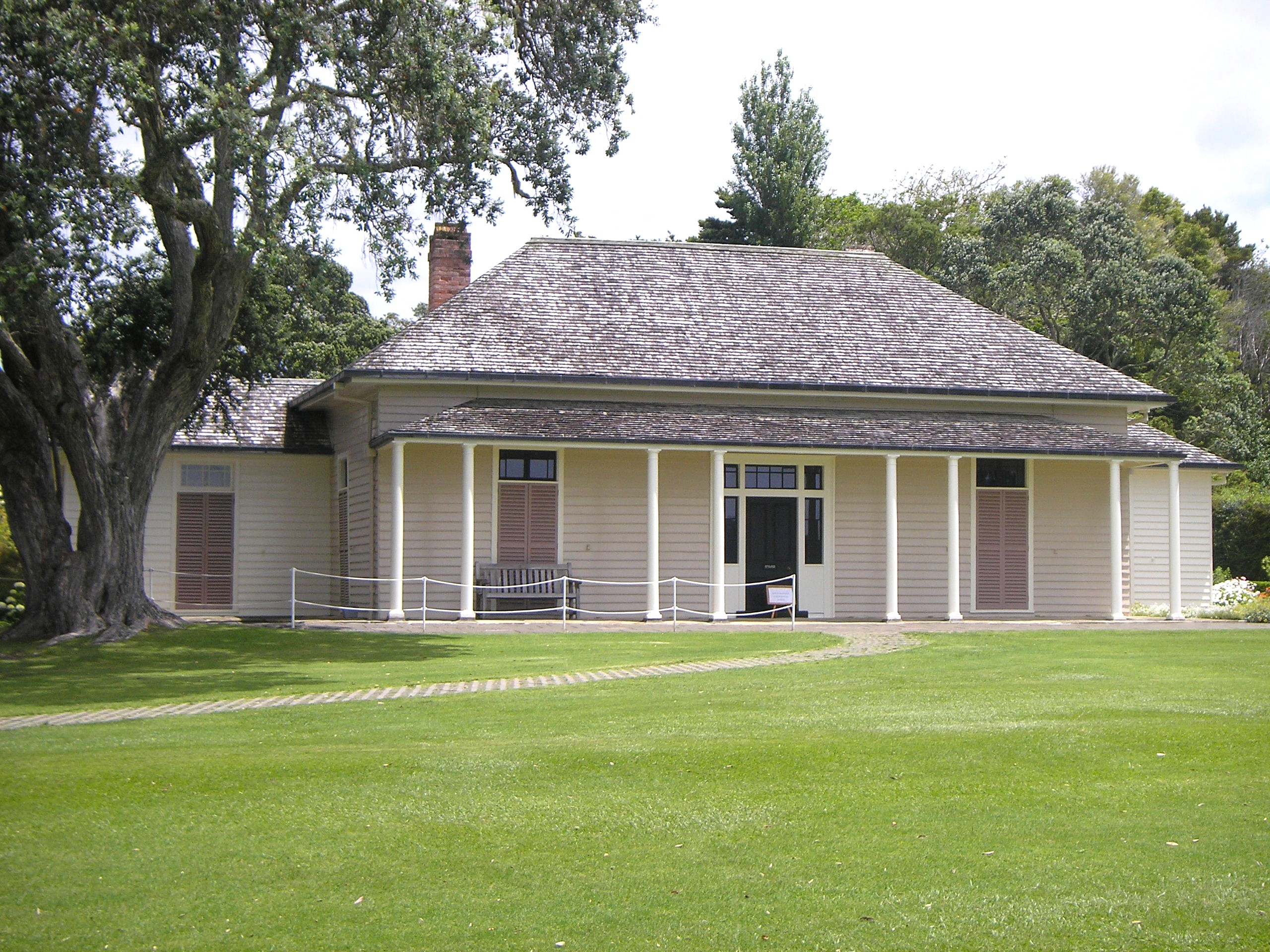
Treaty House, the Busbys' residence at Waitangi

As the wife of the British Resident, Agnes Busby's role was to entertain and provide hospitality for visiting dignitaries, ship's officers and local Māori chiefs, and to help James write his despatches to the Colonial Office. The couple were also expected to be the leaders of what colonial society existed in the area at the time (about six families). To provide a level of hospitality befitting the representative of the British government despite the primitive circumstances was a constant challenge requiring much hard work; in a letter to her friend Charlotte Brown at the Tauranga Mission, Busby commented that "our domestic comfort depends so much on our own exertion".

However, reports from contemporaries suggest that she managed well: a letter from Edward Markham, a visitor to Waitangi in 1834, recorded that Busby was "very pleasant" and the stay in her home "a glimpse of Civilisation". Caroline Mair, whose father Gilbert Mair was an early trader and settler in nearby Paihia, described Busby as "a very dignified and rather exclusive little Scotch lady, but kindly withal".

Busby gave birth to four children while at Waitiangi: John (1834), Sarah (1835), James (1838), and George (1839).

The first baby, John, was delivered by a visiting ship's surgeon, and Marianne Williams (trained maternity nurse and wife of the missionary Henry Williams). 36 hours after the birth, local Māori attacked the house's store-room, and Williams described a scene of "great agitation" as James Busby was shot at and a piece of wood cut his face. After this incident, he tried to employ a Māori guard but failed, and the family left for the safety of Australia for some months. Busby himself delivered Agnes' fourth baby, George, as the doctor was slow in arriving.

== Later life ==
In 1839, the British government sent William Hobson to Waitangi to investigate the state of the settlement and relations between Māori and Pakeha. As a result of changes to the British presence in New Zealand, the Busbys and their children departed for Sydney. They returned in 1841, farmed land in the Bay of Islands, and had two more children, William (1841) and Agnes (1842).

James Busby died in 1871, during a trip to England for an eye operation. Following his death, Agnes returned to Waitangi and lived with a son and his family. She died at Pakaraka on 13 October 1889 and is buried in the churchyard at Paihia.
