= William Patchett =

- Died: 17 June 1843; Wairau, New Zealand

William Patchett (died 17 June 1843) was among the Europeans who died in the Wairau Affray.

Patchett died in Wairau, New Zealand.
