= Hine-i-turama Ngatiki =

Hine-i-tūrama Ngātiki (1818 – 2 April 1864) was a New Zealand Māori woman of mana, who identified with the Ngāti Whakaue iwi within Te Arawa. She was born in New Zealand in 1818, the daughter of Te Koeke and her husband Kahana-tokowai, from Mokoia Island, Rotorua.

In 1841 she married the Danish mariner and whaler Phillip Tapsell who had settled in New Zealand. Their wedding ceremony at Whakatāne was carried out by Jean Baptiste Pompallier, the first Roman Catholic bishop in New Zealand.

When she was visiting the Waikato in 1864, fighting broke out during the Invasion of the Waikato. She and her daughter Ewa were helping to defend the Orakau Pa but they were killed when the British stormed the pa. Both were buried on the battlefield.
