= 1841 in New Zealand =

- Decades: 1820s; 1830s; 1840s; 1850s; 1860s
- See also: History of New Zealand; List of years in New Zealand; Timeline of New Zealand history

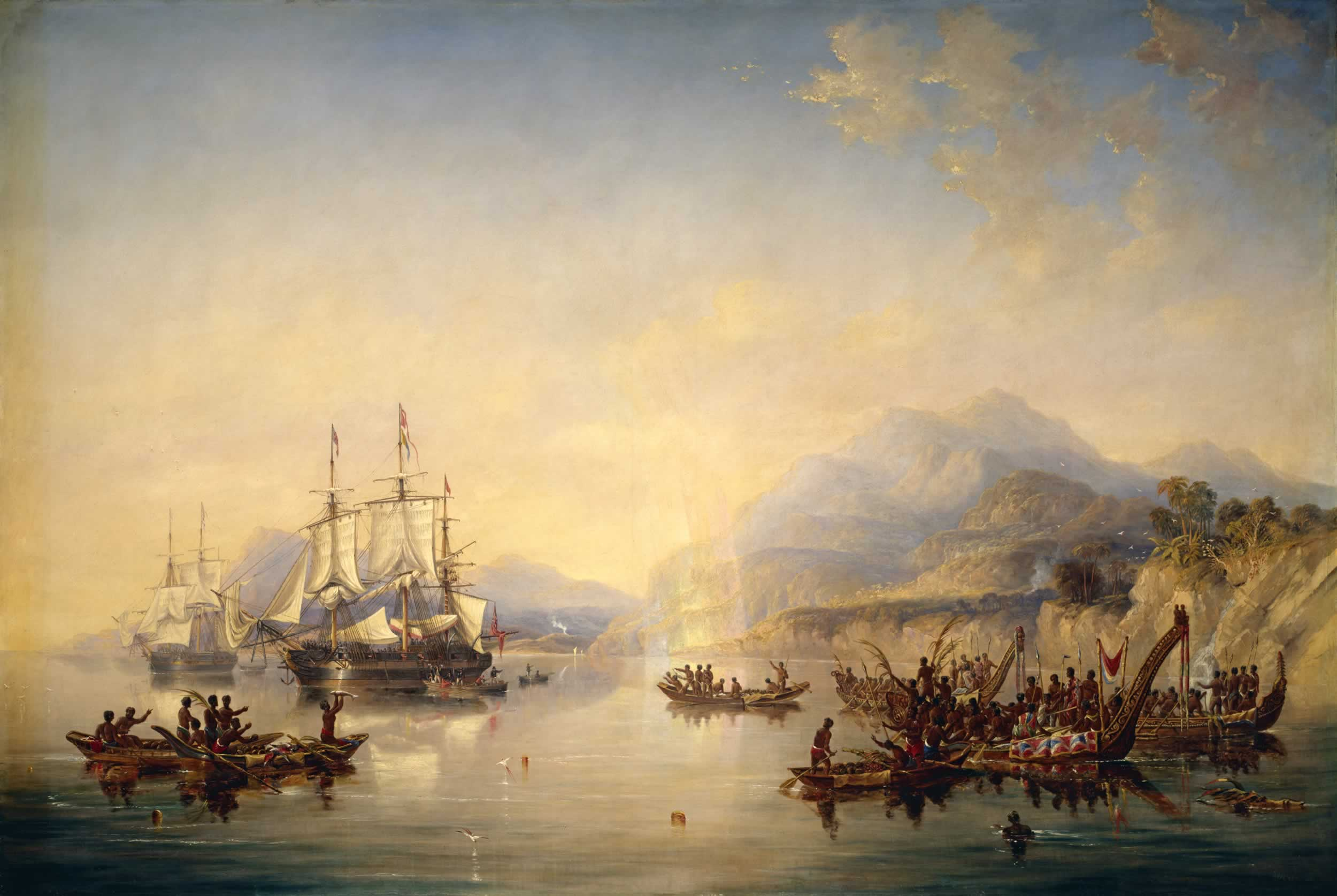
'Erebus' and the 'Terror' in New Zealand, August 1841 by John Wilson Carmichael

The following lists events that happened during 1841 in New Zealand.

== Population ==
The estimated population of New Zealand at the end of 1841 is 78,400 Māori and 5000 non-Māori.

== Incumbents ==
=== Regal and viceregal ===
- Head of State – Queen Victoria
- Governor of New South Wales – Sir George Gipps (overall responsibility for New Zealand until 3 May)
- Governor – Captain William Hobson (Lieutenant- Governor until 3 May then Governor)

=== Government and law ===
- Chief Justice – William Martin is appointed the first Chief Justice of New Zealand on 5 February, but does not arrive in New Zealand until August.

== Events ==
- 31 March: The William Bryan arrives at Taranaki from Plymouth, bearing 148 settlers to found New Plymouth.
- March: Captain Rhodes builds the first wharf in Wellington, in front of his store on the Wellington waterfront.
- 3 May: In anticipation of the Great Charter coming into force, William Hobson is sworn in as Governor of New Zealand.
- 1 July: The Colony of New Zealand comes into existence, a separate Crown colony from New South Wales.
- 10 July: The New Zealand Herald and Auckland Gazette begins publication. The newspaper lasts less than a year.
- 27 September: Foundation of a school for Catholic boys, the first school in Auckland.
- 29 October: the settler ship Brilliant arrives at Cornwallis, New Zealand from the British Isles— however, the passengers find bare land at the promised location of the settlement.
- 8 November: The Auckland Chronicle and New Zealand Colonist begins publishing. It continues with some gaps until 1845.

=== Undated ===
- The Capital of New Zealand is moved from Okiato (Old Russell) to Auckland.
- The first recorded mining in New Zealand, as outcrops of manganese are mined on the coast of Kawau Island.
- George Selwyn is created the first Anglican Bishop of New Zealand.

== Sport ==
=== Horse racing ===
- January: A hurdle race is run in January at Te Aro Pā, Wellington.

==== Unknown date ====
- The Auckland Town Plate is contested at Epsom Downs. A committee of army officers and townspeople forms to control racing in Auckland (Epsom). (see also 1849).

== Yachting ==
- January: The first sailing regatta in the country is held as part of Anniversary celebrations in Wellington.

== Births ==
- 20 January (in England): William Steward, politician
- 28 February: John Duthie, politician and Mayor of Wellington
- 9 March (in Switzerland): Henry Suter, zoologist

Unknown date

- James McGowan, politician

== Deaths ==
- 23 November: William Cornwallis Symonds, prominent early colonist

== See also ==
- List of years in New Zealand
- Timeline of New Zealand history
- History of New Zealand
- Military history of New Zealand
- Timeline of the New Zealand environment
- Timeline of New Zealand's links with Antarctica
