= 1840 in New Zealand =

- Decades: 1820s; 1830s; 1840s; 1850s; 1860s
- See also: History of New Zealand; List of years in New Zealand; Timeline of New Zealand history

1840 is considered a watershed year in the history of New Zealand: The Treaty of Waitangi is signed, British sovereignty over New Zealand is proclaimed, organised European settlement begins, and Auckland and Wellington are both founded.

== Population ==
The estimated population of New Zealand at the end of 1840 is 80,000 Māori and 2,050 non-Māori.

== Incumbents ==
=== Regal and viceregal ===
- Head of State — Queen Victoria
- Governor of New South Wales — Sir George Gipps
- Lieutenant-Governor — Captain William Hobson

=== Government and law ===
Hobson appointed the following officers to form the first New Zealand Government;

- Major Thomas Bunbury, 80th Regiment, commanding her Majesty's Troops in New Zealand, appointed us Magistrate of the Territory – 30 March 1840.
- Willoughby Shortland, Esq, J.P... Acting Colonial Secretary and registrar of records — 7 March 1840.
- Felton Mathew, Esq, J.P., Surveyor General — 1 January 1840.
- John Johnson, Esq, M.D, J.P, Colonial Surgeon— 6 February 1840.
- William Davies, Esq, M.D., Surgeon, Health Officer— 1 June 1840.
- William Cornwallis Symonds, Esq, Police Magistrate— 17 March 1840.
- Charles Barrington Robinson, Esq, Police Magistrate— 28 March 1840.
- Michael Murphy Esq, Police Magistrate— 30 March. 1810.
- H.D. Smart, Lieutenant 28th Regiment, Magistrate of the Territory — 1 January 1840.
- James Heady Clendon Esq, Magistrate of the Territory — 21 February 1840.
- Thomas Beckham Esq, Magistrate of the Territory— 17 March 1810.
- Mr William Mason, Superintendent of Public Works— 1 March 1840.
- Mr Charles Logie, Colonial Storekeeper — 15 January 1840.

== Events ==
=== January — June ===
- 3 January — The Cuba arrives in Port Nicholson with a survey party to prepare for the New Zealand Company settlement.
- 22 January — The first shipload of New Zealand Company immigrants arrives in Wellington on the Aurora and lands at Petone, which they name Britannia.
- 29 January — Lieutenant-Governor Captain William Hobson arrives in the Bay of Islands. With Hobson are the members of the Executive Council, Colonial Secretary Willoughby Shortland, Colonial Treasurer George Cooper and Attorney-General Francis Fisher and the Legislative Council comprising the Executive Council and three Justices of the Peace.
- 5 February — Māori chiefs assemble at Waitangi to discuss the terms of the Treaty of Waitangi.
- 6 February — Hōne Heke is the first to sign the Treaty of Waitangi at the Bay of Islands.
- 19 February — French settlers under the command of Captain C. Lavaud, unaware of the Treaty of Waitangi, depart France in the L’Aube on their way to Akaroa. (see 1838)
- 1 March — Governor Hobson suffers a stroke.
- 24 March — The first bank in New Zealand, the Union Bank, is opened in Britannia.
- March
  - — Jean Langlois leaves France in the Comte de Paris with more colonists for Akaroa.
  - — Johnny Jones sends the first settlers (as opposed to whalers or sealers) to the South Island. They land from the Magnet and settle behind Cornish Head at Waikouaiti.
- 6 April — George Clarke is appointed Protector of Aborigines by Governor Hobson.
- 18 April — The New Zealand Gazette and Britannia Spectator prints its second issue in Britannia, becoming the first newspaper published in New Zealand. The first issue was printed in England the previous year. The paper publishes weekly, changing its name to The New Zealand Gazette and Wellington Spectator a few months later.
- 21 May — Governor Hobson proclaims British sovereignty over New Zealand.
- May
  - — First capital established at Okiato, which was at the time named Russell.
  - — Reverend James Watkin, sent by Johnny Jones, arrives at Waikouaiti and starts the first mission in the South Island.
- 15 June — The New Zealand Advertiser and Bay of Islands Gazette begins publishing in Kororāreka. The newspaper publishes its last issue on 10 December 1840. It was suppressed because of anti-government tendencies.
- 16 June — HMS Herald, Captain Joseph Nias, arrives at Port Underwood with Major Thomas Banbury to obtain signatures from southern chiefs to the Treaty of Waitangi. The final signatures are added the next day. Later in the month the Herald arrives in Stewart Island where Banbury formally takes possession of the island in the name of Queen Victoria.

=== July — December ===
- 14 July — The first hotel licence in New Zealand is issued to the Duke of Marlborough in Kororāreka.
- July
  - — The L’Aube arrives in New Zealand. Lavaud is made aware of the Treaty of Waitangi.
  - — Governor Hobson sends HMS Britomart under Captain Stanley, along with 2 British magistrates to Akaroa.
- 10 August — HMS Britomart arrives in Akaroa.
- 11 August — Union Jack is flown over Akaroa.
- 13 August — William Brown and Logan Campbell take up residence on Browns Island (Motukorea).
- 15 August — French settlers on the L’Aube arrive in Akaroa.
- 16 August — The Comte de Paris arrives in Akaroa.
- 15 September — The Anna Watson arrives in the Waitematā Harbour from the Bay of Islands to establish a new capital for New Zealand.
- 18 September — The British flag is raised at the fort on Point Britomart on the southern shore of the Waitematā Harbour marking the foundation of Auckland.
- September
  - — After discovering their original site is prone to flooding, the Wellington settlers move around the harbour to Thorndon, the site of the present city.
- 20 October — 3,000 acres (12 km^{2}) is purchased from local Ngāti Whātua chiefs for the Auckland settlement.
- November
  - — Queen Victoria signs a Royal charter for New Zealand to become a Crown colony separate from New South Wales.

==== Undated ====
- St Peter's School, the first Catholic school in New Zealand, opened in Kororāreka.
- First post office in New Zealand established in Kororāreka by William Hayes.

== Births ==
- 11 June: Percy Smith, ethnologist and surveyor (d. 1922)
- 13 September: Abner Clough, farm worker (d. 1910)
- (date not known, in India): William Fraser, politician

== See also ==
- List of years in New Zealand
- Timeline of New Zealand history
- History of New Zealand
- Military history of New Zealand
- Timeline of the New Zealand environment
- Timeline of New Zealand's links with Antarctica
