= 1839 in New Zealand =

- Decades: 1810s; 1820s; 1830s; 1840s; 1850s
- See also: Other events of 1839; Timeline of New Zealand history

The following lists events that happened during 1839 in New Zealand.

== Incumbents ==
=== Regal and viceregal ===
- Head of State – Queen Victoria
- Governor of New South Wales – Sir George Gipps
- Lieutenant-Governor – Captain William Hobson (ratified 30 July)

== Events ==
- 3 March or 4 March – John Carne Bidwell is the first European to climb Mount Ngauruhoe. Ngāti Tūwharetoa chief, Te Heuheu Tukino II is enraged that the tapu on the mountain has been disregarded and bans further climbs.
- May
  - – The New Zealand Land Company is formed from the New Zealand Colonisation Company, the New Zealand Land Company and the 1825 New Zealand Company. (see 1838)
- 4 May – William Wakefield of the New Zealand Company leaves from London for New Zealand on the Tory
- 30 July – Ratification of William Hobson as Lieutenant-Governor of New Zealand.
- August
  - – The Tory arrives at Ship Cove, New Zealand in Queen Charlotte Sound.
- 13 August – Confirmation of Hobson's appointment as British consul to New Zealand.
- 14 August – Lord Normanby issues Hobson with instructions for official dealings with New Zealand.
- September
  - – After 5 weeks in Ship Cove, the Tory sails for Port Nicholson arriving later that month.
  - – After 5 days of negotiations William Wakefield arranges the purchase of land at Petone at the mouth of the Hutt Valley for a settlement to be known as Brittania.
- December
  - – William Wakefield, along with naturalist Ernst Dieffenbach, explores northwards along the west coast of the North Island looking for other possible sites for settlements for the New Zealand Company. Wakefield decides that the Taranaki is the most favourable location.
- 23 December – While visiting the Taranaki Ernst Dieffenbach, along with whaler James Heberley, becomes the first European to climb Mount Taranaki/Egmont.

Undated

- The Weller brothers whaling settlement at Otakou on the shore of Otago Harbour has the largest population of Europeans in New Zealand outside the Bay of Islands/Hokianga.
- An Anglican mission station is established at Ōtaki by Reverend Octavius Hadfield.
- A whaling station and trading post is set up at Wairoa by Captain William Barnard Rhodes.

== Births ==
- 5 January (in Bohemia): Gottfried Lindauer, painter

=== Unknown date ===
- (in Jersey): Edward Bartley, architect

== Deaths ==
- 28 October: Makea Pori Ariki, sovereign of the Cook Islands
- 20 November: John Williams, missionary

=== Unknown date ===
- Te Wera Hauraki, Ngāpuhi tribal leader

== See also ==
- List of years in New Zealand
- Timeline of New Zealand history
- History of New Zealand
- Military history of New Zealand
- Timeline of the New Zealand environment
- Timeline of New Zealand's links with Antarctica
