= 1838 in New Zealand =

- Decades: 1810s; 1820s; 1830s; 1840s; 1850s
- See also: History of New Zealand; List of years in New Zealand; Timeline of New Zealand history

The following lists events that happened during 1838 in New Zealand.

== Incumbents ==
=== Regal and viceregal ===
- Head of State – Queen Victoria
- Governor of New South Wales – Sir George Gipps, having been appointed on 5 October 1837, arrives in Sydney on 23 February.

=== Government and law ===
- British Resident in New Zealand — James Busby

== Events ==
- 10 January
  - — Bishop Jean Baptiste Pompallier arrives in New Zealand at Totara Point on the Hokianga Harbour.
  - — Flax trader James Farrow purchases an acre of land at Otumoetai, Tauranga.
- 13 January – Bishop Pompallier celebrates the first Catholic mass on land in New Zealand at the home of Thomas and Mary Poynton at Totara Point.
- February
  - — The offer of a Royal charter to the New Zealand Association to take responsibility for the administration of New Zealand is withdrawn. (see 1837, December).
- April
  - — The French whaler Cachalot, commanded by Jean Langlois, arrives in New Zealand waters and commences whaling near the Chatham Islands.
- May
  - — The Cachalot arrives at Banks Peninsula accompanied by the French corvette Héroine.
- 2 August – Jean Langlois completes the purchase of Banks Peninsula from local Māori and makes a downpayment of goods to the value of 150 francs. Captain Cecille of the Héroine raises the French flag and proclaims French sovereignty over Banks Peninsula.
- August
  - — The New Zealand Association is wound up. In its place the New Zealand Colonisation Company and the New Zealand Land Company are established. (see also 1839)

Undated

- The Reverend Alfred Nesbitt Brown re-opens the Anglican mission at Tauranga. (see also 1836 & 1837)
- Three Gisborne Māori, having had Christian instruction in the Bay of Islands, return as catechists.

== Births ==
- 6 October (in Scotland): John McKenzie, politician.
- (unknown date, in Yorkshire England): Henry Hirst, politician.

== See also ==
- List of years in New Zealand
- Timeline of New Zealand history
- History of New Zealand
