= Michael Murphy (New Zealand magistrate) =

New Zealand clerk, police magistrate and sub-sheriff

Michael Murphy (1806 – 14 August 1852) was a notable New Zealand clerk, police magistrate and sub-sheriff. He was born in Ireland in about 1806.
