= Te Purewa =

Te Purewa (?–1842?) was a notable New Zealand tribal leader, war leader and peacemaker. Of Māori descent, he identified with the Tuhoe iwi. He was born in Whaitiripapa, Bay of Plenty, New Zealand.
