= Synod of Otago and Southland =

Synod of Otago and Southland Regions of New Zealand

The Synod of Otago and Southland is a synod of the Presbyterian Church of Aotearoa New Zealand (PCANZ). Originally independent, the Synod merged with the northern Presbyterian church in 1901 to form the Presbyterian Church of Aotearoa New Zealand.

== History ==
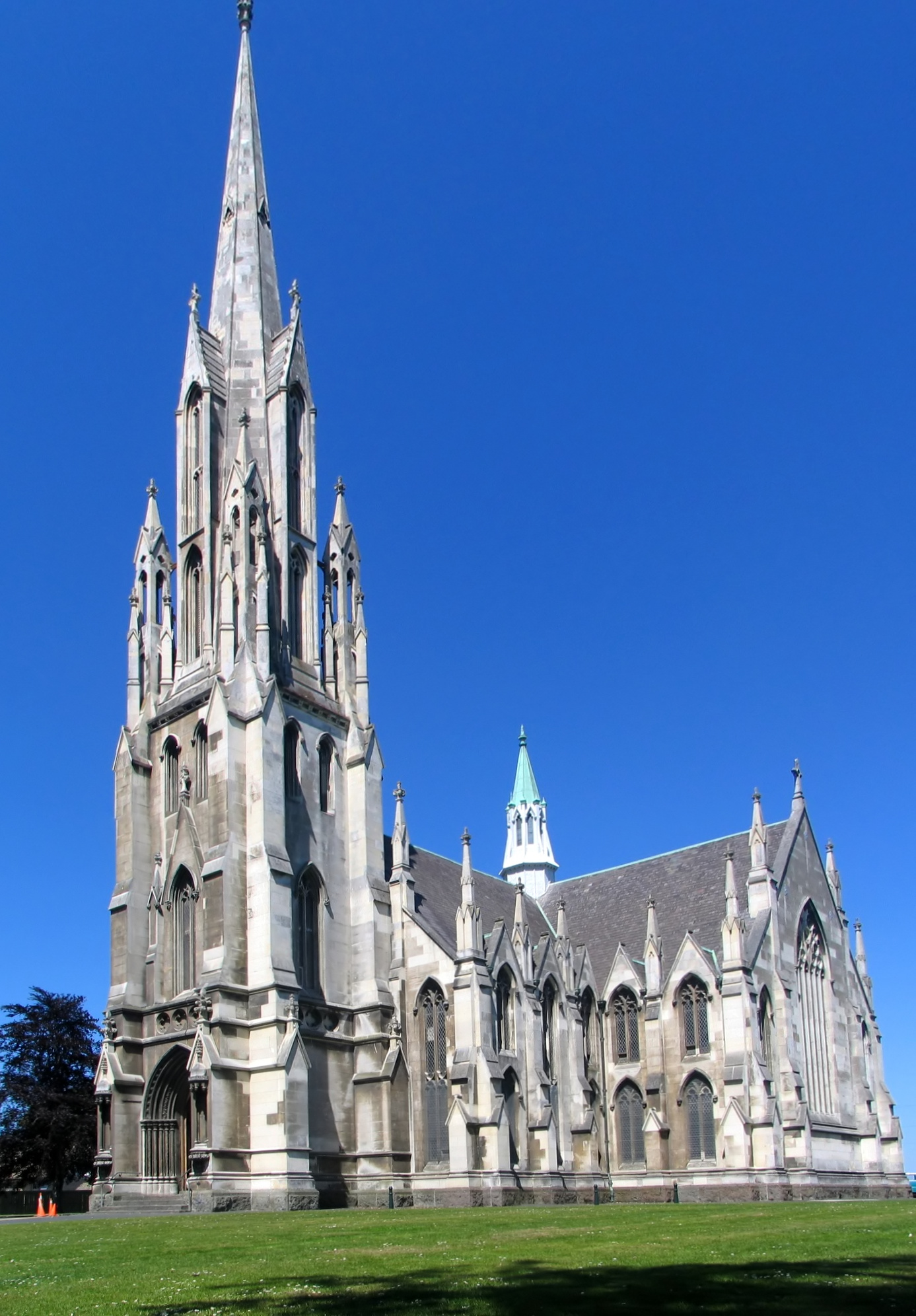
First Presbyterian Church in Dunedin

The origins of the Synod of Otago and Southland began as early as 1848. A migration scheme was set up in the mid nineteenth century to settle Otago with a homogeneous group of settlers. The scheme decided on members of the Free Kirk who had split from the Church of Scotland in the Disruption of 1843. Many Scotsmen were displaced by the Highland Clearances and the opportunity to own and farm their own land appealed to many.

The first two ships of immigrants, including the Rev. Thomas Burns, a nephew of Robert Burns, sailed from Greenock, near Glasgow, in 1847 and arrived March 1848 . The settlers established the city of Dunedin, Scottish Gaelic for Edinburgh. They formed into local congregations and set up the Presbyterian structures of church courts independent of the Presbyterian church that already existed in the north. Many other settlers followed with more ministers among them, and in 1855 the Presbytery of Otago was formed with responsibility for the area south of the Waitaki River and distributing the growing income from church property trusts.

It is said that in 1861 Dunedin was perhaps as Presbyterian as Edinburgh itself, but with the discovery of gold in what became the Otago gold rush, many men left their homes and headed for the diggings. People came from Australia and around the world to mine in Otago and the Presbytery urgently appealed to Scotland to send more ministers. These were sent and in 1866 the Presbytery was broken up into the presbyteries of Dunedin, Clutha, and Southland, all under the jurisdiction of the Synod of Otago and Southland. The number of ministers remained inadequate and in 1872 it was proposed that the Synod should build a seminary. In 1880 a theological college was formally established.

== Union ==
As soon as the Presbytery of Otago was formed in 1854 it sent a letter to the congregations and presbyteries of the northern church about the importance of cooperation and union between the two churches. Although they represented different sides of the 1843 split the two churches still held common doctrine, polity and discipline. The responses were initially friendly replies, but no further effort was made at uniting the two groups until 1861 when a joint committee was formed and prepared a basis of union. Slight differences between the two groups delayed further progress for some time. The northern church had always been self-supporting, but the Synod of Otago and Southland had been granted a large tract of valuable land, and the Synod was keen to retain ownership of that land in the case of union with the northern church. The open-minded northern church lived among a more mixed population than the conservative Synod which had insisted that only members of the Free Church of Scotland could join its community. From the beginning a large number of the Synod wished to join with the northern church, but an influential minority successfully resisted. This group softened its opposition, however, and in 1901 the two churches united under the name of The General Assembly of the Presbyterian Church of New Zealand. The Synod wished to continue its existence, and since it had been established by act of parliament and could not be dissolved, it became a court of the united church and retained control of its trusts. The Synod of Otago and Southland remains the only regional court of the Presbyterian Church of Aotearoa New Zealand.

== Present function ==
The Synod performs some functions that would be the responsibility of the Assembly Office or the Church Property Trustees north of the Waitaki. Parishes and church campsite committees in Otago and Southland can apply to the Synod thought their presbyteries for approval to buy, sell, alter or lease buildings, borrow money or make application to the New Zealand Lottery Grants Board.

The Otago Foundation Trust Board is a sister organization of the Synod and the perpetual trustee for Presbyterian properties south of the Waitaki River. The Trust Board administers funds from which the Synod makes grants to eligible organizations.

At its annual meetings in April the Synod decides the destination of these grants. Most of these funds go to parishes in Otago and Southland, but the Synod has a policy of allocating funds up to 25 percent of total available income to the national church for enterprises which are based in Otago and Southland.
