= Abner Clough =

Abner Clough (13 September 1840 – 22 April 1910) was a New Zealand farm worker, and a well-known local character. He was born in Akaroa, North Canterbury, New Zealand, on 13 September 1840. Abner stood at a height of 6 feet 4 inches, and weighed sixteen stone. His black hair and beard, swarthy complexion, beetling eyebrows, and erect bearing gave him a leonine and commanding appearance. One of his contemporaries once said, "Abner does not usually walk but goes at a slow jog; none has ever been able to keep up with him in New Zealand yet". There is a mountain top in New Zealand called Abner's Head. It was his lookout point when searching for stray cattle.
