= Rose Whitty =

Irish Dominican Sister and missionary

Rose Whitty (November 24, 1831 – May 4, 1911) was an Irish Dominican religious sister and founder of convents. She was a native of Dublin. Of her two sisters one became a Religious of the Sacred Heart; the other, like herself, joined the Dominican Order as a religious sister of the Third Order Regular.

Whitty entered St. Catherine's Convent, Sion Hill, Blackrock, Co. Dublin, in her 19th year, 25 March 1849. Seventeen years later, at the request of Bishop Patrick Moran, who then had charge of the Eastern Vicariate of South Africa, she with five others began their work at Port Elizabeth, 23 November 1867. She served for 25 years as prioress of Rosemary Convent, which she had founded. The diamond jubilee of her religious profession was celebrated in 1910, and a Mother Rose scholarship was founded as an appropriate memorial of her long devotion to the work of education.

Whitty remained in good health until a month or two before her death in her 80th year. She was buried in the cemetery of Emerald Hill Priory, one of the convents which she had founded, on 6 May 1911.
