= Phillip Tapsell =

Phillip Tapsell, born Hans Homan Jensen Falk (1777/1791? – 6 or 7 August 1873) was a Danish mariner, whaler, and trader who settled in New Zealand.

== Arrival in New Zealand ==
Tapsell first arrived in New Zealand at the Bay of Islands on the New Zealander on 26 March 1810. He commanded the whaling ship Minerva in the 1820s. He was married three times. The first marriage was to Maria Ringa, conducted by the missionary Thomas Kendall in the Bay of Islands on 23 June 1823, and claimed (by Tapsell himself) as the first Christian wedding in New Zealand. In 1828 or November 1830 he settled in Maketu and began trading flax. His third wife was Hine-i-turama Ngatiki, who was killed in the Battle of Orakau.

At one time Tapsell owned both Whakaari (White) and Moutohora (Whale) islands and he lived for a while on the latter.

== Descendants ==
His great-grandson, Sir Peter Tapsell, was a member of the New Zealand Parliament from 1981 to 1996 and a Speaker of the House.
