= Thomas McDonnell Sr. =

co-Resident of New Zealand (with James Busby)
- In office 1835–1836

Personal details
- Born: 1788 County Antrim, Ireland
- Died: 13 September 1864 (aged 75–76) Onehunga, Auckland

Thomas McDonnell Sr. (1788 – 13 September 1864) was a timber trader and Additional British Resident in New Zealand. His oldest son was Colonel Thomas McDonnell.

McDonnell Sr. was born in County Antrim, Ireland. He joined the Royal Navy in 1804, and left on half-pay and joined the East India Company in 1815. He was in command of a brig in the China seas in 1830 and visited the Kaipara and the Hokianga in New Zealand around this time.

He bought a property at Horeke on the Hokianga Harbour in 1831 and developed a trading, timber and shipbuilding business. He later visited England and was appointed an additional British Resident for the Hokianga district in late 1834 or early 1835. He arrived back in New Zealand in July 1835. He resigned as Additional Resident just one year later after several disputes with British Resident James Busby.

After ongoing disputes with Māori, other settlers and officials in the Hokianga, McDonnell moved to Whangārei in 1858, and then immediately to Onehunga. He died there after a fall from his horse in 1864.
