= Alfred Brown (missionary) =

English missionary (1803–1884)

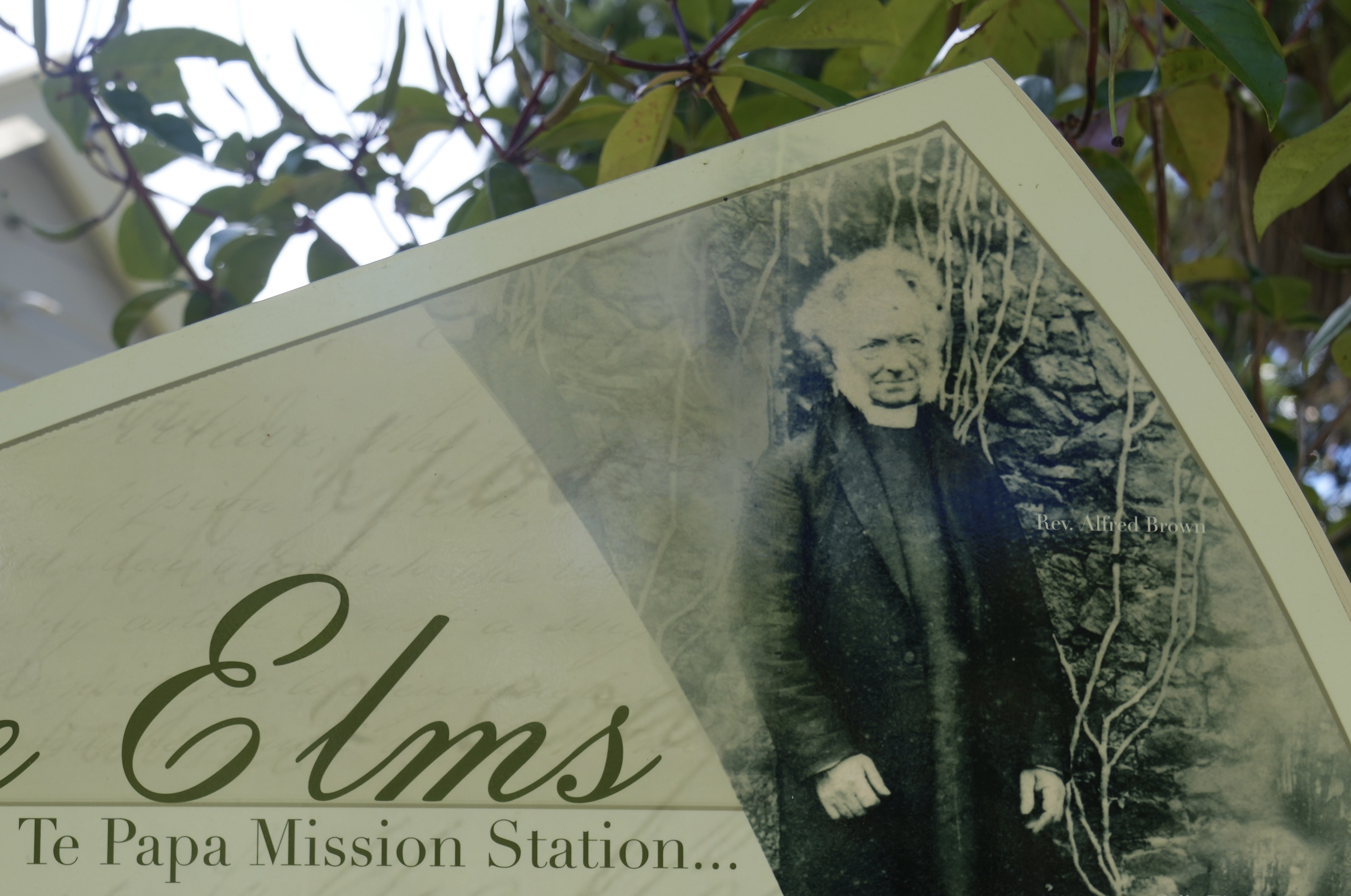
- Photo of Alfred Brown on the sign for The Elms, formerly the Te Papa Mission Station.
- Born: 23 October 1803; Colchester, England
- Died: 7 September 1884 (aged 80); Tauranga, New Zealand
- Occupation: Missionary
- Spouse(s): Charlotte Arnett (married 1829, died 1855); Christina Crombie Grant Johnston (married 1860)

Alfred Nesbit Brown (23 October 1803 – 7 September 1884) was a member of the Church Missionary Society (CMS) and one of a number of English missionaries who travelled to New Zealand in the early 19th century to bring Christianity to the Māori people.

== Early life and voyage to New Zealand ==
Brown was born in Colchester, England and joined the CMS at the age of 20. He was ordained as a priest on 1 June 1828 by the Bishop of London in the Chapel Royal, St James's Palace. He married his first wife Charlotte Arnett in 1829. They sailed for Sydney, New South Wales on 25 April 1829 on the Elizabeth. The couple arrived at Paihia on board the City of Edinburgh on 29 November 1829.

Although an ordained priest, Brown was sent to New Zealand to instruct the children of the mission families in the Bay of Islands. Charlotte, who had been a teacher in Islington, London, taught the girls from the Paihia mission station. They were at Kerikeri in 1830. A son, Alfred Marsh, was born in Paihia on 22 June 1831.

== Missions ==
From 6 February to 17 May 1834, Brown and James Hamlin walked through the Auckland and Waikato regions. He and John Alexander Wilson were appointed to open a mission station in Matamata early in 1834. In the same year, he opened Te Papa mission station at Tauranga.

In 1835, Te Waharoa, the leader of the Ngāti Hauā iwi (Māori tribe) of the Matamata region, lead his warriors against neighbouring tribes to avenge the death of a relative, with the fighting, which continued into 1836, extended from Rotorua, Matamata to Tauranga.

After a house at the Rotorua mission was ransacked, both the Rotorua mission and the Matamata mission was not considered to be safe and the wives of the missionaries were escorted to Puriri and Tauranga. Wilson and the other CMS missionaries attempted to bring peace to the belligerents. In late March 1836, a war party led by Te Waharoa arrived at Tauranga and the missionary families boarded the Columbine as a safety precaution on 31 March. They spend 1837 in the Bay of Islands. Alfred and Charlotte's daughter, Marianne Celia, was born in the Bay of Islands on 25 April 1837. In January 1838 Brown re-opened the Te Papa mission station. In 1937 the missionaries at Te Papa Mission were Brown, James Stack and Wilson. In 1846 he was assisted by the Rev. C.P. Davies.

== Work as archdeacon, death of son ==
Bishop Selwyn appointed Brown Archdeacon of Tauranga on 31 December 1843. Marsh Brown was sent to St John's Collegiate School at Waimate North, Bay of Islands, in March 1844. In April he suffered an accident which resulted in an illness, probably erysipelas. He never recovered, and died at Te Papa on 14 September 1845. He was buried in the mission cemetery.

Brown's work as a missionary flourished throughout the 1840s. He travelled widely throughout his archdeaconry often spending several weeks away from home as he visited Maori villages throughout the Bay of Plenty and Taupo regions.

== Decline of mission, death of wife, remarriage ==
However, as conditions changed in the 1850s with increasing immigration, the influence of the missionaries began to decline. Charlotte died on 12 November 1855 in Auckland at the age of 59. She is buried in St Stephen's churchyard, Parnell.

Brown's daughter, Celia, married Rev. John Kinder on 15 December 1859. Brown himself remarried on 18 February 1860, to Christina Johnston, sister of Wellington Supreme Court Judge Alexander Johnston.

== Later life and death ==
Although most of Brown's converts drifted away after the battles of Gate Pa and Te Ranga in 1864, he still considered himself to be a missionary. He and Christina purchased 17 acres of land around the Te Papa mission station from the CMS in 1873, renaming the property "The Elms", by which name it is known today.

Alfred Nesbit Brown died on 7 September 1884. He is buried in the mission cemetery, Tauranga, with his second wife Christina, who died on 26 June 1887.

Brown's house remained in his second wife's family, including Duff Maxwell, for several generations. The Elms (Te Papa Tauranga) has been preserved and is open to the public.

== See also ==
- New Zealand Church Missionary Society
- Wiremu Tamihana

== Gallery ==
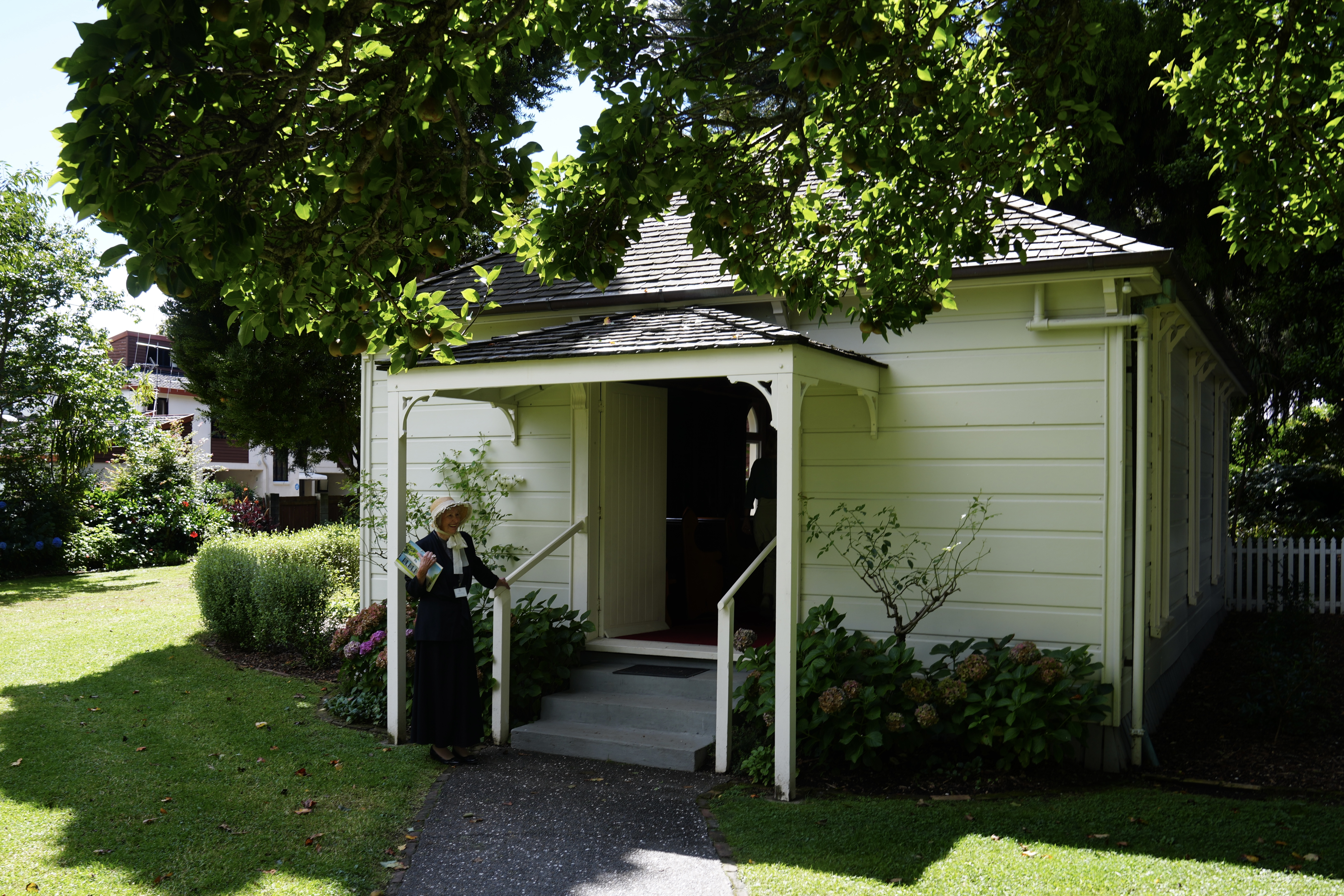
The Chapel, a replica of the original mission chapel at the Te Papa Mission Station

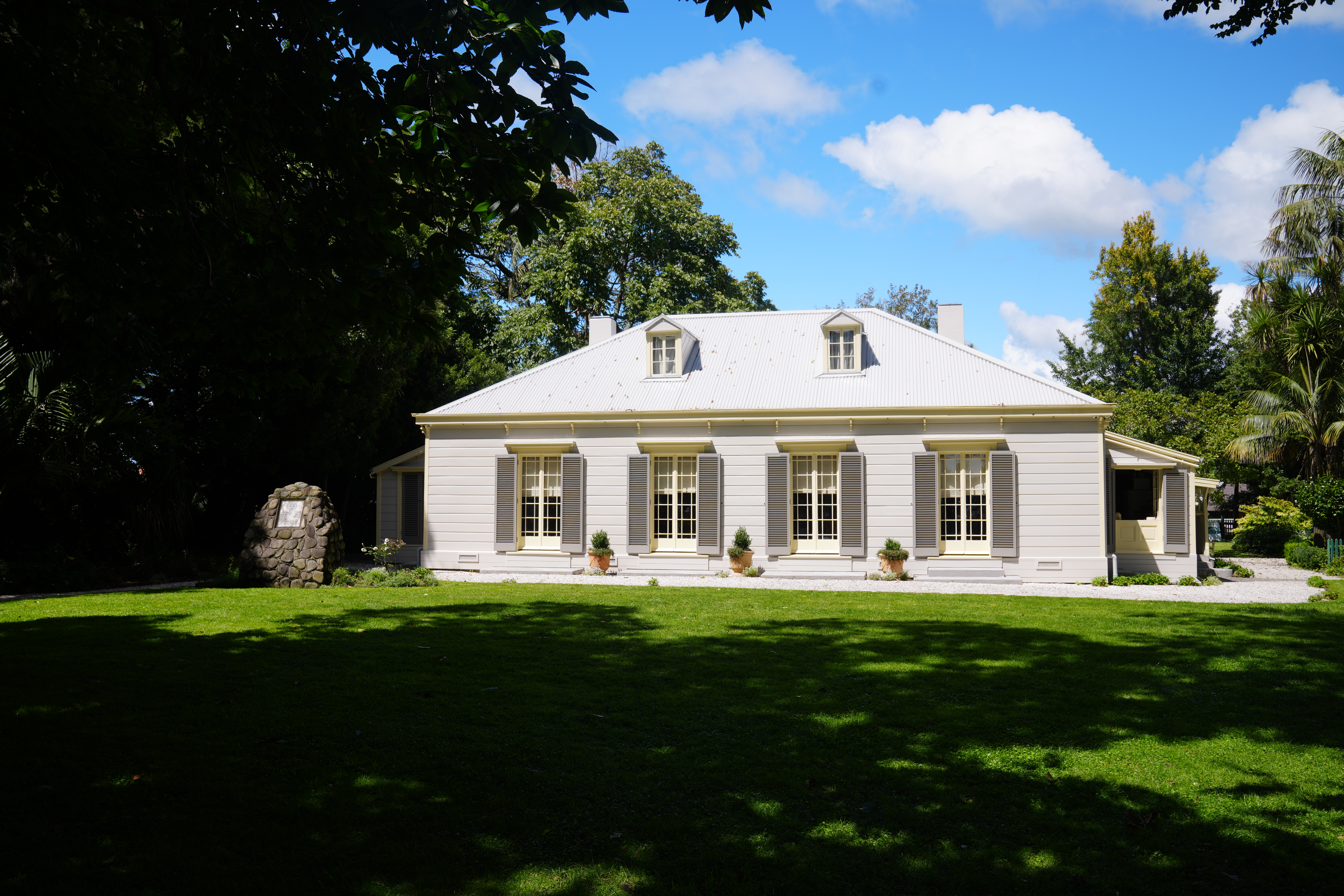
The Mission House at The Elms

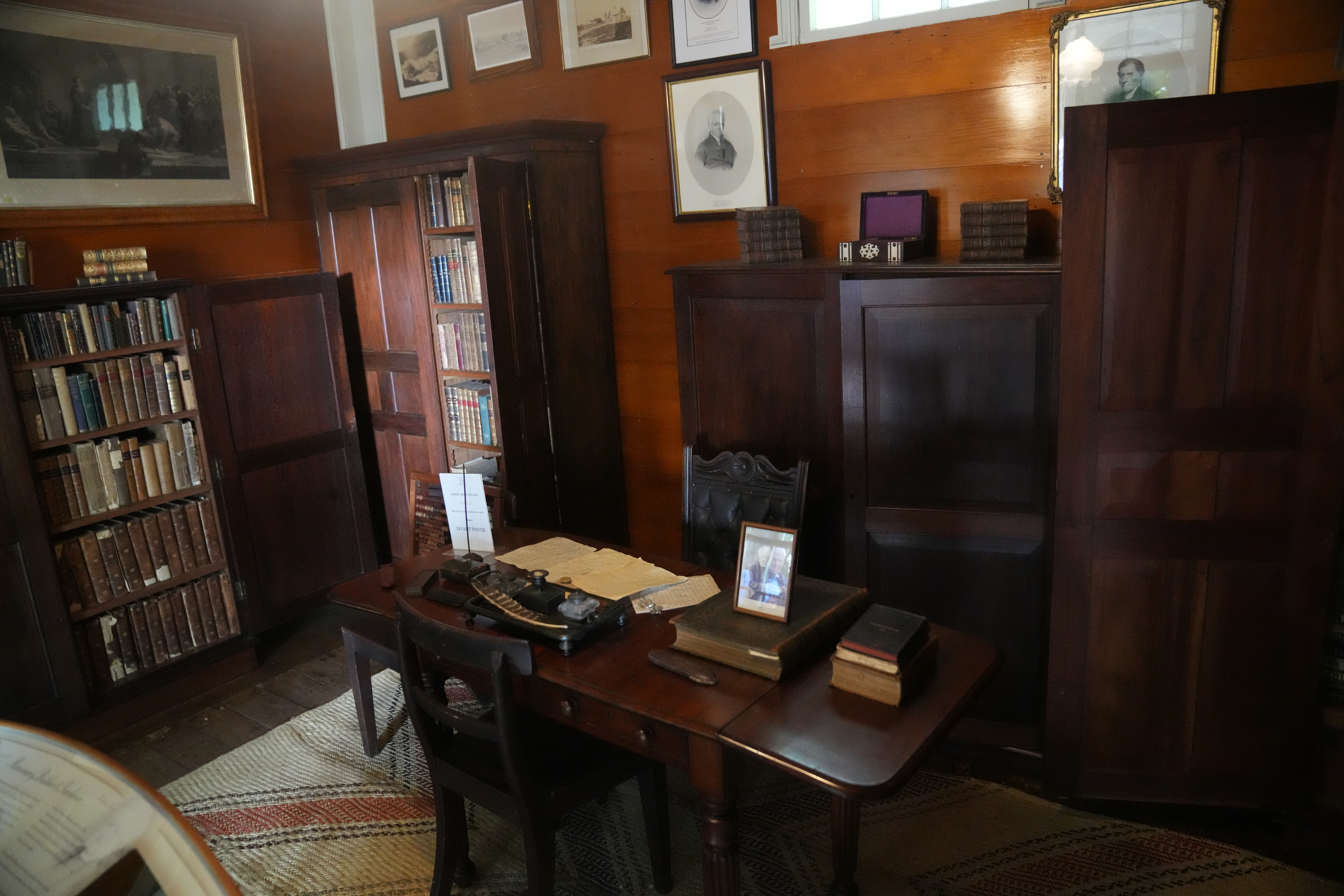
Alfred Brown’s library at The Elms

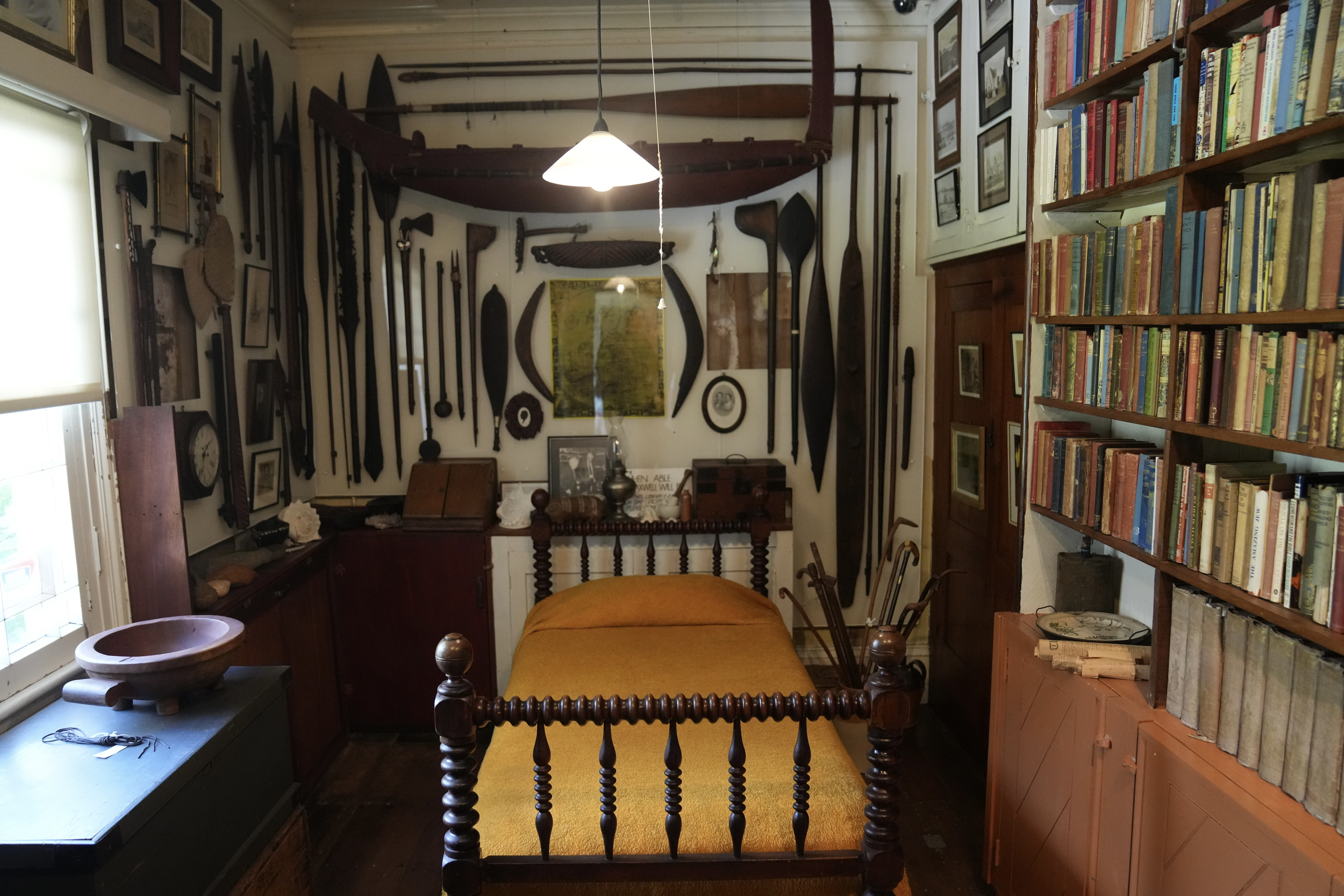
Duff Maxwell’s room at The Elms. Maxwell was a passionate collector of everything. He surrounded himself with books, pictures and artefacts.

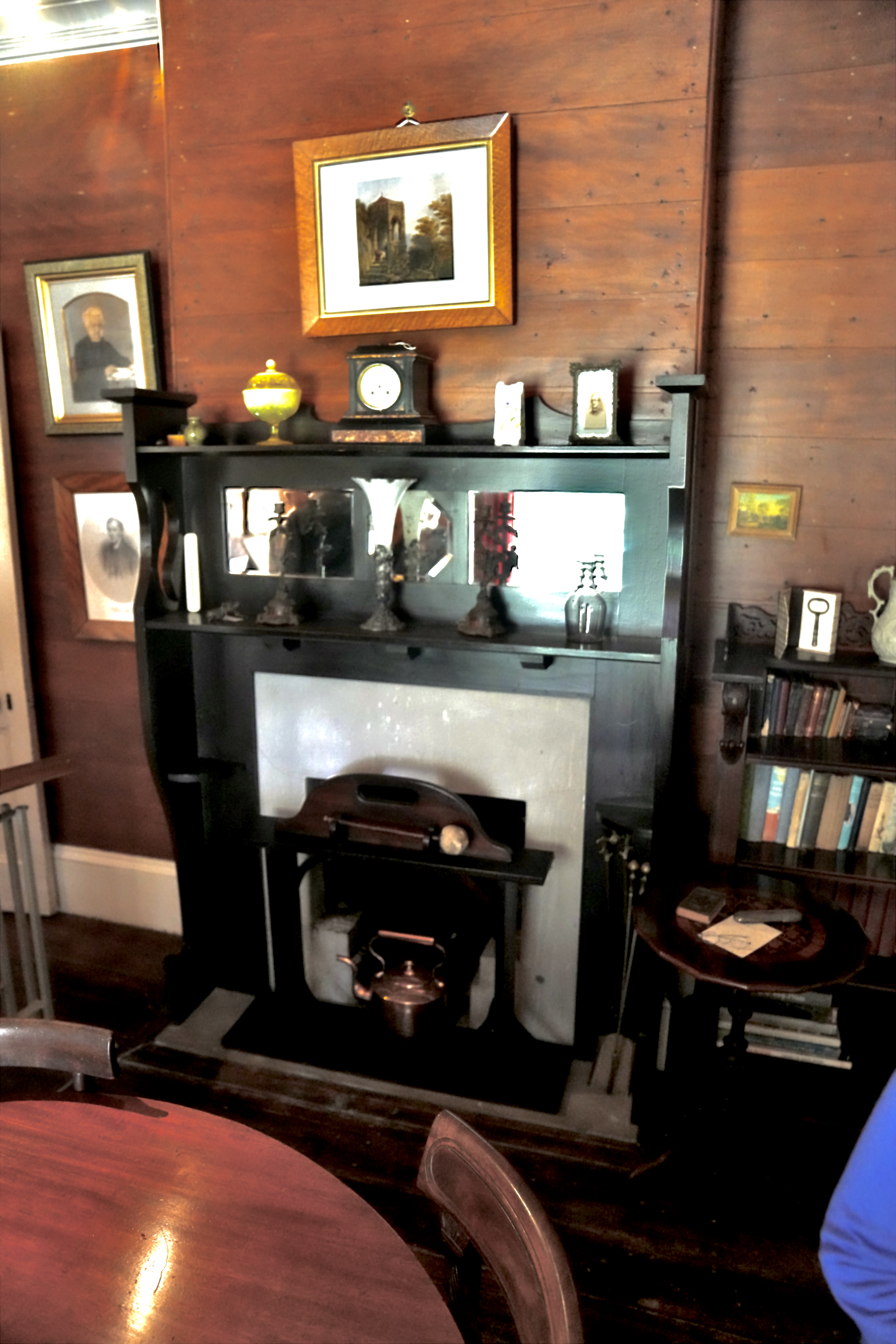
The fireplace in the dining room of the mission house at The Elms

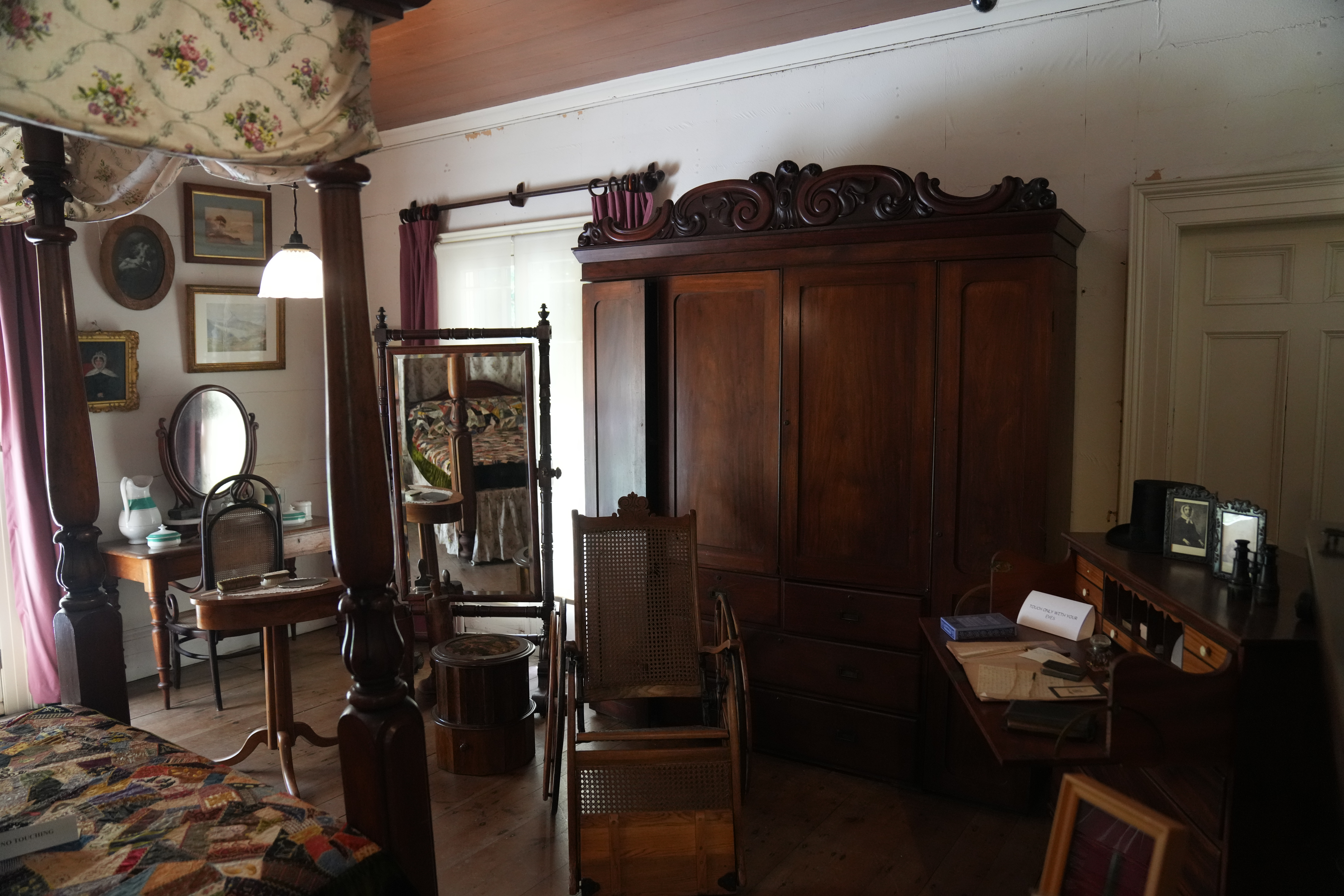
The main bedroom of the mission house
