= James Busby =

Scottish/Australian/New Zealand wine farmer and politician (1802-1871)

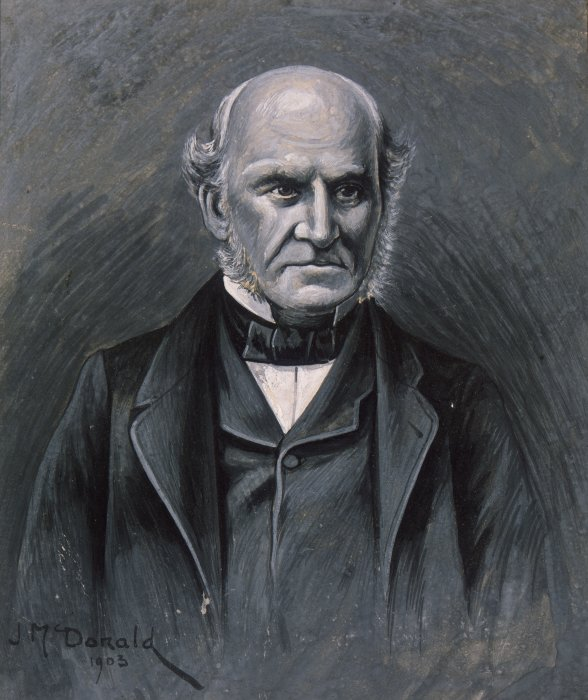

British Resident in New Zealand
- In office March 1833 – 28 January 1840

Bay of Islands councillor
- In office 1853–1855

Bay of Islands councillor
- In office 1857–1863

Personal details
- Born: 7 February 1802 Edinburgh, Scotland
- Died: 15 July 1871 (aged 69) Anerley, London, UK
- Spouse(s): Agnes Busby (née Dow; m. 1832)

James Busby (7 February 1802 – 15 July 1871) was the British Resident in New Zealand from 1833 to 1840. He was involved in drafting the 1835 Declaration of the Independence of New Zealand and the 1840 Treaty of Waitangi. As British Resident, he acted as New Zealand's first jurist and the "originator of law in Aotearoa", to whom New Zealand "owes almost all of its underlying jurisprudence". Busby is regarded as the father of the Australian wine industry, as he brought the first collection of vine stock from Spain and France to Australia.

== Biography ==
=== Early life ===
James Busby was born in Edinburgh, Scotland, the son of English engineer John Busby and mother Sarah Kennedy. His parents and he emigrated from Britain to Sydney, New South Wales, in 1824.

Busby received a Grant of Land from the Governor of New South Wales as part of a policy to encourage free settlers with capital. After careful deliberation, he chose a block of 2,000 acres in the Coal River area of the Hunter Valley, where he began growing grapes. At the same time, he took employment at the Male Orphans School at Bald Hills near Liverpool where he was in charge of the farm and taught viticulture. When the trustees of the Church and School Corporation took over control of the school in 1827, Busby lost the job. He was then appointed as the head tax collector until 1829. The government made him a new job offer but he was not happy with it nor with the terms of his severance from the orphan school, and returned to England in 1831 to petition the Colonial Office. He also visited Spain and France to further his study in viticulture. He wrote several reports that he presented to the Colonial Office and one on the state of New Zealand earned him appointment as British Resident in New Zealand in March 1832. Busby returned to Sydney on 16 October 1832.

=== In New Zealand ===
Busby married Agnes Dow at Segenhoe, in the Hunter Region, on 1 November 1832. He left for New Zealand on HMS Imogene in April 1833 and arrived in the Bay of Islands on 5 May. Agnes followed him, arriving the following year. Treaty House, which still stands, was completed for him at Waitangi, where he planted some of the vine stock he had collected in Europe, from which vineyard wine was being made before his vines were productive in Australia. His duties, outlined by Governor of New South Wales Richard Bourke, were to protect British commerce, control, and to mediate between the unruly European settlers in New Zealand and Māori people. However, he was not provided with any resources to impose this authority. In 1834, he convened the United Tribes of New Zealand.

After an unregistered New Zealand ship was seized in Australia, Busby proposed that New Zealand should have a national flag. A selection of three or four designs was sent from Australia, and Māori chiefs chose one at a meeting at his residency on 20 March 1834.

==== Independence and Treaty of Waitangi ====
In 1835, Busby learned that Baron Charles de Thierry, a Frenchman, was proposing to declare French sovereignty over New Zealand. He drafted the Declaration of the Independence of New Zealand and at a meeting in October 1835, he signed it together with 35 chiefs from the northern part of New Zealand.

In 1836 and 1837, outbreaks of tribal fighting in the Bay of Islands, Rotorua and elsewhere prompted Busby to report that he considered his position untenable. In May 1837, Bourke sent William Hobson to assess the situation.

After the arrival of William Hobson in 1840, Busby co-authored with him the Treaty of Waitangi. It was first signed on 5 and 6 February 1840 on the lawn outside his residence. Busby and his family left Waitangi that year. He declined an offer for a position in the new colonial government, and instead focused on farming interests.

Australia experienced a depression in the 1840s, and Busby had to mortgage the Waitangi property to meet debts.

He became entangled in litigation over his own land titles: the New Zealand Banking Company seized his Waitangi property without giving Busby's debtors an opportunity to pay what they owed, and George Grey expropriated Busby's land at Whangārei.

In the 1853 New Zealand provincial elections, he was elected a member of the council of the Auckland Province, where he became an outspoken supporter of establishing Auckland as a separate colony to the rest of New Zealand.

He contested the 1860–1861 New Zealand general election for a seat in the New Zealand House of Representatives for the Bay of Islands electorate, but was unsuccessful.

From 1861 to 1863, Busby was editor of a bi-weekly newspaper, the Aucklander, established in part to fight government policy on land claims. Popular opinion at the time went against Busby, and some newspapers claimed his arguments for Auckland's separation were due to his inability to settle land claims with the colonial government.

In 1864, he travelled to England to plead his land title case; he was refused a hearing. In 1868, he settled his case for scrip worth £36,800, but which he sold for £23,000. He had spent nearly £14,000 in legal fees.

=== Later life ===
In 1871, after traveling to England for an eye operation, Busby died in Anerley, England of "congestion of the lungs". and is buried at West Norwood Cemetery in London. His wife returned to New Zealand; she died at Pakaraka in 1889 and is buried at Paihia. James and Agnes had six children. Daughter Sarah married John William Williams, son of missionary Henry Williams.

The Waitangi property, on which the Treaty was signed, was derelict until the 1930s, when it was purchased by the Governor-General of New Zealand of the day, Viscount Bledisloe and donated to the New Zealand Government.

== Published writings ==
- Treatise on the Culture of the Vine (1825)
- A Manual of Plain Directions for Planting and Cultivating Vineyards and for Making Wine in New South Wales (Sydney 1830)
- Journal of a Tour through some of the vineyards of Spain and France (Sydney 1833)

== See also ==
- Australian wine
- New Zealand wine
- List of wine personalities

== Notes ==
1. For a year overlapping 1835–6, Busby shared this office with Thomas McDonnell

== Sources ==
- Brett, André (June 2016). Acknowledge No Frontier – The Creation and Demise of New Zealand's Provinces, 1853–76. Dunedin: Otago University Press. ISBN 978-1-927322-36-9.
