= 1967 in New Zealand =

- Decades: 1940s; 1950s; 1960s; 1970s; 1980s
- See also: History of New Zealand; List of years in New Zealand; Timeline of New Zealand history

The following lists events that happened during 1967 in New Zealand.

== Population ==
- Estimated population as of 31 December: 2,745,000.
- Increase since 31 December 1966: 33,700 (1.24%).
- Males per 100 females: 100.2.

== Incumbents ==
=== Regal and viceregal ===
- Head of State – Elizabeth II
- Governor-General – Brigadier Sir Bernard Fergusson GCMG GCVO DSO OBE, followed by Sir Arthur Porritt Bt GCMG GCVO CBE.

=== Government ===
The 35th Parliament of New Zealand commenced, with the second National government in power.

- Speaker of the House – Roy Jack.
- Prime Minister – Keith Holyoake
- Deputy Prime Minister – Jack Marshall.
- Minister of Finance – Harry Lake until 21 February (death), then Robert Muldoon.
- Minister of Foreign Affairs – Keith Holyoake.
- Attorney-General – Ralph Hanan.
- Chief Justice — Sir Richard Wild

=== Parliamentary opposition ===
- Leader of the Opposition – Norman Kirk (Labour).
- Leader of the Social Credit Party – Vernon Cracknell

=== Main centre leaders ===
- Mayor of Auckland – Roy McElroy
- Mayor of Hamilton – Denis Rogers
- Mayor of Wellington – Frank Kitts
- Mayor of Christchurch – George Manning
- Mayor of Dunedin – Russell John Calvert

== Events ==
- 19 January – A gas explosion in the Strongman coal mine near Greymouth kills 19 miners.
- 23–26 January – The Prime Minister of South Vietnam, Air Marshall Nguyễn Cao Kỳ, tours New Zealand.
- February – Free milk in schools (a half pint daily for each primary school pupil) was stopped, it had been distributed since 1937. Some schools continued it with parents paying.
- 11 March – 1967 Southern Maori by-election: Whetu Tirikatene (Labour) wins the by-election, replacing her late father, Eruera Tirikatene (Labour).
- 19 March – Two tigers are shot dead in Newtown after escaping an insecure enclosure at Wellington Zoo.
- 5 April – An emperor penguin is found at Oreti Beach, Southland, becoming the first recorded sighting of an emperor penguin in New Zealand. The following day, it is released into Foveaux Strait.
- 15 April
  - 1967 Fendalton by-election: Eric Holland (National) wins the by-election, replacing the late Harry Lake (National).
  - 1967 Petone by-election: Fraser Colman (Labour) wins the by-election, replacing the late Mick Moohan (Labour).
- 7-17 May – Railway workers strike after failed wage talks with the government, cancelling rail services nationwide for eleven days.
- 10 July – The nation's currency is decimalised, with the New Zealand dollar replacing the New Zealand pound at a rate of two dollars to a pound.
- 23 September – Referendums were held on whether to extend hotel closing hours (passed), and whether to extend the term of Parliament (failed; see referendum).
- 9 October – Three weeks after the referendum, bar closing times were extended to 10pm; ending the six o'clock swill.
- 1 November – Northlands Shopping Centre in Christchurch opens to shoppers.
- December – The report of the Royal Commission on Compensation for Personal Injury in New Zealand (the "Woodhouse Report") is released, recommending the establishment of a universal no-fault compensation scheme for injuries. The scheme was later realised in 1974 as the Accident Compensation Commission (ACC).

== Arts and literature ==
- James K. Baxter wins the Robert Burns Fellowship.

See 1967 in art, 1967 in literature, Category:1967 books

=== Music ===
==== New Zealand Music Awards ====
Loxene Golden Disc Lee Grant – Thanks To You

See: 1967 in music

=== Radio and television ===
See: 1967 in New Zealand television, 1967 in television, List of TVNZ television programming, Category:Television in New Zealand, Category:New Zealand television shows, Public broadcasting in New Zealand

- 22 February – The Mount Kaukau television transmitter is officially opened by the Prime Minister, providing improved television coverage to the Wellington metro area.

=== Film ===
See: Category:1967 film awards, 1967 in film, List of New Zealand feature films, Cinema of New Zealand, Category:1967 films

== Sport ==
=== Athletics ===
- David McKenzie wins his second national title in the men's marathon, clocking 2:21:50 in Lower Hutt.

=== Chess ===
- The 74th National Chess Championship was held in Christchurch, and was won by Ortvin Sarapu of Auckland (his 9th title).

=== Horse racing ===
==== Harness racing ====
- New Zealand Trotting Cup: Great Adios
- Auckland Trotting Cup: Allakasam

=== Netball ===
- With a team coached by Taini Jamison and captained by Judy Blair, New Zealand won the 1967 World Netball Tournament after winning all seven of their matches. The key victory came in Round 7 against the reigning champions, Australia, with a 40–34 win ensuring New Zealand won the gold.

=== Soccer ===
- The Chatham Cup is won by North Shore United who beat Christchurch City 2–1 in the final.
- Northern League champions: Ponsonby AFC
- Disagreement over the inclusion of a Gisborne team in the Western League caused its dissolution and the establishment of a Central Districts League, with Wanganui omitted but Poverty Bay and Wairarapa included. The premier division was won by Eastern Union
- Provincial league champions:
  - Canterbury: Christchurch City
  - Marlborough: Grosvenor Rovers
  - Nelson: Thistle
  - Otago: Northern
  - South Canterbury: West End
  - Southland: Invercargill United
  - Wanganui: Wanganui Athletic
  - Wellington: Hungaria
  - West Coast: no competition

== Births ==
- 6 January: Craig Perks, golfer.
- 17 March: Andrew Bird, rowing cox.
- 27 March: Anthony Thornton, field hockey player.
- 7 April: Scott Hobson, field hockey player.
- 17 April: Ian Jones, rugby player.
- 5 May: Paul Martin SM (born 5 May 1967) (Bishop-elect) appointed in December 2017 as the 10th Bishop of Christchurch.
- 10 May: Eion Crossan, rugby player
- 23 May: Craig Monk, yachtsman.
- 31 May: Phil Keoghan, television presenter.
- 11 June: Graeme Bachop, rugby player
- 15 June: Paul Kingsman, swimmer.
- 3 July: Nigel Latta, clinical psychologist. (died 2025)
- 12 July: Anthony Beks, swimmer.
- 1 August: Cameron Rhodes, actor.
- 20 August Robert Ironside soccer
- 30 August (in England): Justin Vaughan, cricketer.
- 4 September: Darrin Murray, cricketer.
- 18 September (in England): Gary Anderson, cyclist.
- 13 October: Bernard Beckett, writer.
- 21 October: Gavin Lovegrove, javelin thrower.
- 26 October: Keith Urban, country singer.
- Niki Caro, filmmaker.
- Megan Gay, actress.
- Katherine Rich, politician.

Category:1967 births

== Deaths ==
- 11 January: Sir Eruera Tirikatene, politician
- 17 January: George Yerex, wildlife conservator
- 4 February: James Roberts trade unionist, former president of Labour Party
- 21 February: Harry Lake, politician, minister of finance
- 7 April: Louis Daly Irving Austin, pianist, music teacher, conductor, composer and critical gadfly
- 23 May: Robert Macalister, Mayor of Wellington.
- 25 September: P. H. Matthews, politician
- 22 October: Leonard Morton Wright, Mayor of Dunedin
- 3 November: Alexander Aitken, mathematician
- December: Edwin Thoms Cox (in Adelaide), Mayor of Dunedin
- Rehutai Maihi, tribal leader, journalist, newspaper publisher and editor, political candidate and community leader

Category:1967 deaths

== See also ==
- List of years in New Zealand
- Timeline of New Zealand history
- History of New Zealand
- Military history of New Zealand
- Timeline of the New Zealand environment
- Timeline of New Zealand's links with Antarctica

For world events and topics in 1967 not specifically related to New Zealand see: 1967
