= 1963 in New Zealand =

- Decades: 1940s; 1950s; 1960s; 1970s; 1980s
- See also: History of New Zealand; List of years in New Zealand; Timeline of New Zealand history

The following lists events that happened during 1963 in New Zealand.

== Population ==
- Estimated Population as of 31 December: 2,566,900.
- Increase since 31 December 1962: 51,100 (2.03%).
- Males per 100 Females: 100.8.

== Incumbents ==
=== Regal and Vice Regal ===
- Head of State – Elizabeth II
- Governor-General – Brigadier Sir Bernard Fergusson GCMG GCVO DSO OBE.

=== Government ===
The 33rd New Zealand Parliament concluded and a general election was held on 30 November. This saw the National Party returned with the loss of one seat to have a majority of 10 seats.

- Speaker of the House – Ronald Algie.
- Prime Minister – Keith Holyoake
- Deputy Prime Minister – Jack Marshall.
- Minister of Finance – Harry Lake.
- Minister of Foreign Affairs – Keith Holyoake.
- Attorney-General – Ralph Hanan.
- Chief Justice — Sir Harold Barrowclough

=== Parliamentary opposition ===
- Leader of the Opposition – Walter Nash (Labour) until 31 March, then Arnold Nordmeyer (Labour).

=== Main centre leaders ===
- Mayor of Auckland – Dove-Myer Robinson
- Mayor of Hamilton – Denis Rogers
- Mayor of Wellington – Frank Kitts
- Mayor of Christchurch – George Manning
- Mayor of Dunedin – Stuart Sidey

== Events ==
- 6 February – Elizabeth II arrives in New Zealand on the Royal Yacht Britannia for the 1963 Royal Tour of New Zealand.
- 7 February – 15 people killed in a bus crash due to brake failure in the Brynderwyn Hills in Northland.
- 4 April – BOAC launches New Zealand's first jet-powered air service between Auckland Whenuapai and London Heathrow using the De Havilland Comet. The route takes 37.5 hours, with stops in Sydney, Darwin, Singapore, Rangoon or Calcutta, Karachi, Beirut or Damascus, and Rome or Düsseldorf.
- 17 April – Tauranga becomes a city.
- 3 July – New Zealand National Airways Corporation Flight 441 crashes into the Kaimai Ranges, killing all 23 aboard.
- 7 December – Two people are killed in the Bassett Road machine gun murders.

== Arts and literature ==
- Maurice Shadbolt wins the Robert Burns Fellowship.

See 1963 in art, 1963 in literature

=== Music ===
See: 1963 in music

=== Radio and Television ===
- There are 80,000 television licences issued, and an estimated 300,000 television viewers in New Zealand.
- Broadcast relay stations at Mount Te Aroha, Wharite Peak and Otahoua are commissioned, extending television coverage to Waikato, Tauranga, Manawatu and Wairarapa.

See: 1963 in New Zealand television, 1963 in television, List of TVNZ television programming, Category:Television in New Zealand, Category:New Zealand television shows, Public broadcasting in New Zealand

=== Film ===
See: Category:1963 film awards, 1963 in film, List of New Zealand feature films, Cinema of New Zealand, Category:1963 films

== Sport ==
=== Athletics ===
Jeff Julian wins his first national title in the men's marathon, clocking 2:22:52 on 9 March in Hāwera.

=== Chess ===
- The 70th National Chess Championship is held in Christchurch. The title is shared by Ortvin Sarapu and R.J. Sutton, both of Auckland.

=== Horse racing ===
==== Harness racing ====
- New Zealand Trotting Cup – Cardigan Bay
- Auckland Trotting Cup – Cardigan Bay (2nd win)

=== Lawn bowls ===
The national outdoor lawn bowls championships are held in Wellington.

- Men's singles champion – A. Govorko (Ngongotaha Bowling Club)
- Men's pair champions – S.W. Jolly, J.N.S. Flett (skip) (Point Chevalier Bowling Club)
- Men's fours champions – J.D. Scott, N. Cash, J. Coltman, Bill O'Neill (skip) (Carlton Bowling Club)

=== Netball ===
- At the 1963 World Netball Tournament, the inaugural Netball World Cup, New Zealand finished as runners up.

=== Soccer ===
- The Chatham Cup was won by North Shore United who beat Nomads of Christchurch 3–1 in the final.
- Provincial league champions:
  - Auckland: North Shore United
  - Bay of Plenty: Kahukura
  - Buller: Millerton Rangers
  - Canterbury: Nomads
  - Franklin: Manurewa AFC
  - Hawke's Bay: Napier Rovers
  - Manawatu: Thistle
  - Marlborough: Woodbourne
  - Nelson: Rangers
  - Northland: Otangarei United
  - Otago: King Edward Technical College OB
  - Poverty Bay: Eastern Union
  - South Canterbury: Northern Hearts
  - Southland: Invercargill Thistle
  - Taranaki: Moturoa
  - Waikato: Hamilton Wanderers
  - Wairarapa: Lansdowne United
  - Wanganui: Wanganui United
  - Wellington: Diamond
  - West Coast: Cobden-Kohinoor
- The second (and last) Rothmans Cup (see 1962) was won by North Shore United.

== Births ==
- 10 January: Malcolm Dunford, footballer
- 21 February: Greg Turner, golfer.
- 16 March: Kevin Smith, actor.
- 4 June: Sean Fitzpatrick, rugby union player.
- 18 June: Paul Honiss, rugby referee.
- 30 June: Mark Bourneville, rugby league player
- 20 July: Catherine Campbell, cricketer.
- 20 July: Mike Davidson, freestyle swimmer.
- 20 August: Ian Woodley, field hockey goalkeeper.
- 26 August: Christine Arthur, field hockey player.
- 9 September (in England): Sarah Illingworth, cricketer.
- 10 September: Jay Laga'aia, actor.
- 17 September: Warren Gatland, rugby player and coach.
- 11 December: Mark Greatbatch, cricketer.
- 24 December: David Grundy, field hockey player.
- Joanna Bourke, historian.
- Andrew Johnston, poet.
- (in Poland): Ralph Talmont, photographer.

== Deaths ==
- 7 January: Tāpihana Paraire Paikea, politician
- 19 March: Fred Hackett, politician
- 4 April: Hercules Wright, rugby union player
- 16 May: Fintan Patrick Walsh, trade unionist
- 18 June Albert Samuel, politician
- 4 July: (in England) Bernard Freyberg, 1st Baron Freyberg, soldier, Governor-General of New Zealand
- 14 July: Maud Basham (Aunt Daisy), radio personality
- 19 August: Rosemary Rees, writer and theatre producer
- 19 September: Sir David Low, cartoonist (in London)
- Te Iki-o-te-rangi Pouwhare, tribal leader, historian and genealogist

Category:1963 deaths

== See also ==
- List of years in New Zealand
- Timeline of New Zealand history
- History of New Zealand
- Military history of New Zealand
- Timeline of the New Zealand environment
- Timeline of New Zealand's links with Antarctica

For world events and topics in 1963 not specifically related to New Zealand see: 1963
