= 1962 in New Zealand =

- Decades: 1940s; 1950s; 1960s; 1970s; 1980s
- See also: History of New Zealand; List of years in New Zealand; Timeline of New Zealand history

Article from Friday June 15, 1962: The New York Times reports the acquisition of local New Zealand production plants by Nabisco.

The following lists events that happened during 1962 in New Zealand.

== Population ==
- Estimated population as of 31 December: 2,515,800.
- Increase since 31 December 1961: 54,500 (2.21%).
- Males per 100 females: 101.0.

== Incumbents ==
=== Regal and viceregal ===
- Head of State – Elizabeth II
- Governor-General – The Viscount Cobham GCMG TD, followed by Brigadier Sir Bernard Fergusson GCMG GCVO DSO OBE.

=== Government ===
- Speaker of the House – Ronald Algie.
- Prime Minister – Keith Holyoake
- Deputy Prime Minister – Jack Marshall.
- Minister of Finance – Harry Lake.
- Minister of Foreign Affairs – Keith Holyoake.
- Attorney-General – Ralph Hanan.
- Chief Justice — Sir Harold Barrowclough

=== Parliamentary opposition ===
- Leader of the Opposition – Walter Nash (Labour)

=== Main centre leaders ===
- Mayor of Auckland – Dove-Myer Robinson
- Mayor of Hamilton – Denis Rogers
- Mayor of Wellington – Frank Kitts
- Mayor of Christchurch – George Manning
- Mayor of Dunedin – Stuart Sidey

== Events ==
- The Office of the Ombudsman was established

=== January ===
- 1 January: Samoa (then called Western Samoa) attains full independence, becoming the first independent Polynesian territory.

=== February ===
- 5 February: Dunedin lawyer James Patrick Ward was killed by a letter bomb sent to his office in what police described as "one of the most callous murders in the history of New Zealand crime".

=== August ===
- 11 August: New Zealand Railways's Cook Strait ferry service began, using the GMV Aramoana.

=== November ===
- 12 December: The Flag of Wellington is adopted.

== Arts and literature ==
- R.A.K. Mason wins the Robert Burns Fellowship.

See 1962 in art, 1962 in literature, Category:1962 books

=== Music ===
See: 1962 in music

=== Radio and television ===
- New Zealand Broadcasting Service (NZBS) is restructured on 1 April to form New Zealand Broadcasting Corporation.
- An outside broadcast van is in use in Auckland, and similar vans are ordered for Wellington and Christchurch.
- Dunedin gets television service with the launch of DNTV2 on 31 July.
- There are 23,343 licensed television sets in New Zealand.

See: 1962 in New Zealand television, 1962 in television, List of TVNZ television programming, Category:Television in New Zealand, Public broadcasting in New Zealand

=== Film ===
See: Category:1962 film awards, 1962 in film, List of New Zealand feature films, Cinema of New Zealand, Category:1962 films

== Sport ==
=== Athletics ===
- 27 January: Peter Snell sets a new world record for the mile of 3m 54.4s, running at Cook's Gardens, Wanganui.
- Barry Magee wins his second national title in the men's marathon, clocking 2:24:55.4 in Auckland.

=== British Empire and Commonwealth Games ===
Gold	Silver	Bronze	Total
10	12	10	32

=== Chess ===
- The 69th National Chess Championship was held in Auckland, and was won by G.G. Haase of Dunedin.

=== Horse racing ===
==== Harness racing ====
- New Zealand Trotting Cup – Lordship defeats Cardigan Bay in a rain-affected race
- Auckland Trotting Cup – Dandy Briar

=== Lawn bowls ===
The national outdoor lawn bowls championships are held in Christchurch.

- Men's singles champion – Jeff Barron (Miramar Bowling Club)
- Men's pair champions – Frank Livingstone, Bob McDonald (skip) (Onehunga Bowling Club)
- Men's fours champions – W. Humphreys, S. Barlow, H.W. Todd, R. Brown (skip) (Marlborough Bowling Club)

=== Soccer ===
- The Chatham Cup is won by Hamilton Technical Old Boys who beat Northern of Dunedin 4–1 in the final.
- Provincial league champions:
  - Auckland: Eastern Suburbs AFC
  - Bay of Plenty: Rangers
  - Buller: Waimangaroa Utd
  - Canterbury: Western
  - Franklin: Manurewa AFC
  - Hawke's Bay: Napier Rovers
  - Manawatu: Thistle
  - Marlborough: Woodbourne
  - Nelson: Rangers
  - Northland: Otangarei United
  - Otago: Northern
  - Poverty Bay: Eastern Union
  - South Canterbury: Thistle
  - Southland: Invercargill Thistle
  - Taranaki: Moturoa
  - Waikato: Hamilton Technical OB
  - Wairarapa: Lansdowne United
  - Wanganui: Wanganui Athletic
  - Wellington: Northern
  - West Coast: Runanga
- The inaugural Rothmans Cup was played between the champion clubs from Auckland, Wellington, Canterbury and Otago as a de facto national championship. The final was won by Northern AFC of Dunedin 3-2 on aggregate.

== Births ==
- 12 January (in England): Terry Wiles, thalidomide survivor.
- 4 February: Frank Bunce, rugby union player.
- 17 February: Tony Blain, cricketer.
- 1 March: Russell Coutts, yachtsman.
- 4 March: John Young, composer.
- 15 March: Trevor Franklin, cricketer.
- 6 June: Grant Fox, rugby player.
- 8 June: John Cutler, yachtsman.
- 16 June Jonathan Temm, lawyer.
- 22 July: Rena Owen, actress.
- 5 August: Richard de Groen, cricketer.
- 13 September: Brian Fowler, cyclist.
- 21 September: Kelly Evernden, tennis player.
- 22 September: Martin Crowe, cricketer.
- 27 September: Gavin Larsen, cricketer.
- 9 October: Paul Radisich, racing driver.
- 12 October: Mark S. Olsen, painter.
- 7 November: Debbie Hockley, cricketer.
- 29 December: Wynton Rufer, soccer player.
- Tim Chadwick, artist and writer.
- Jon Stevens, singer.

Category:1962 births

== Deaths ==
- 26 April: Jerry Skinner, Labour politician.
- 20 June John Houston, historian and writer.
- 14 July: Janet Mackenzie, New Zealand teacher
- 18 July: G. H. Cunningham, mycologist and plant pathologist.
- 18 September: Clyde Carr, Labour politician.
- 8 October: Donald Charles Cameron, Mayor of Dunedin
- 20 October: Cora Louisa Burrell, politician (MLC).
- 28 October: Bill Schramm, Labour politician and 11th Speaker of the House of Representatives.

== See also ==
- List of years in New Zealand
- Timeline of New Zealand history
- History of New Zealand
- Military history of New Zealand
- Timeline of the New Zealand environment
- Timeline of New Zealand's links with Antarctica
