= 1966 in New Zealand =

- Decades: 1940s; 1950s; 1960s; 1970s; 1980s
- See also: History of New Zealand; List of years in New Zealand; Timeline of New Zealand history

The following lists events that happened during 1966 in New Zealand.

== Population ==
- Estimated population as of 31 December: 2,711,300.
- Increase since 31 December 1965: 47,500 (1.78%).
- Males per 100 females: 100.7.

== Incumbents ==
=== Regal and viceregal ===
- Head of State – Elizabeth II
- Governor-General – Brigadier Sir Bernard Fergusson GCMG GCVO DSO OBE.

=== Government ===
The 34th Parliament of New Zealand concluded and a general election was held on 26 November. The National Party was returned with a majority of eight seats, having lost one seat to the Social Credit Party who entered parliament for the first time.

- Speaker of the House – Ronald Algie.
- Prime Minister – Keith Holyoake
- Deputy Prime Minister – Jack Marshall.
- Minister of Finance – Harry Lake.
- Minister of Foreign Affairs – Keith Holyoake.
- Attorney-General – Ralph Hanan.
- Chief Justice — Sir Harold Barrowclough (until 17 January), Sir Richard Wild (starting 17 January)

=== Parliamentary opposition ===
- Leader of the Opposition – Norman Kirk (Labour).
- Leader of Social Credit Party – Vernon Cracknell (after 26 November general election)

=== Main centre leaders ===
- Mayor of Auckland – Roy McElroy
- Mayor of Hamilton – Denis Rogers
- Mayor of Wellington – Frank Kitts
- Mayor of Christchurch – George Manning
- Mayor of Dunedin – Russell John Calvert

== Events ==
- 1 January – New Zealand Australia Free Trade Agreement comes into force.
- 4 July – An Air New Zealand Douglas DC-8 on a training flight crashes on takeoff from Auckland Airport, killing two of the five crew members.
- 19–20 October – President of the United States of America Lyndon B. Johnson visits New Zealand, becoming the first serving US president to visit the country (see Visit).
- November – The Grey River Argus ceases publication. The newspaper had been founded in 1865.
- New Zealand appoints an ambassador to Italy and establishes an embassy in Rome.

== Arts and literature ==
- James K. Baxter wins the Robert Burns Fellowship.

See 1966 in art, 1966 in literature

=== Music ===
==== New Zealand Music Awards ====
Loxene Golden Disc Maria Dallas – Tumbling Down

See: 1966 in music

=== Radio and television ===
- Broadcast relay station at Hikurangi, Horokaka, Parahaki Hill and Mount Egmont are commissioned, extending television coverage to central Northland and Taranaki.
- The program Country Calendar first appears on television.
- The C'mon music program, hosted by Peter Sinclair, begins.
- First broadcast of Radio Hauraki from a boat called the TIRI in the Hauraki Gulf outside of New Zealand waters in an attempt to break the Government Monopoly on the New Zealand radio airwaves.

See: 1966 in New Zealand television, 1966 in television, List of TVNZ television programming, Category:Television in New Zealand, Category:New Zealand television shows, Public broadcasting in New Zealand

=== Film ===
- Don't Let It Get You

See: Category:1966 film awards, 1966 in film, List of New Zealand feature films, Cinema of New Zealand, Category:1966 films

== Sport ==
=== Athletics ===
- David McKenzie wins his first national title in the men's marathon, clocking 2:16:59 on 12 March in Hamilton, New Zealand.

=== British Empire and Commonwealth Games ===
Gold	Silver	Bronze	Total
8	5	13	26

=== Chess ===
- The 73rd National Chess Championship was held in Hamilton, and was won by Ortvin Sarapu of Auckland (his 8th title).

=== Horse racing ===
==== Harness racing ====
- New Zealand Trotting Cup: Lordship – 2nd win
- Auckland Trotting Cup: Waitaki Hanover

=== Soccer ===
- The Chatham Cup is won by Miramar Rangers who beat Western (Christchurch) 1–0 in the final.
- Northern League champions: Eastern Suburbs AFC. Teams from Bay of Plenty join the league in its second year.
- The Western League (a forerunner of the Central League) is formed, incorporating Wanganui Athletic, Wanganui United from Wanganui, Kiwi United, Massey University, St. Andrew's and Thistle from Manawatu, Napier Rovers from Hawke's Bay and Moturoa from Taranaki. The first champion is Kiwi United of Palmerston North.
- Provincial league champions:
  - Buller: no competition
  - Canterbury: Christchurch City
  - Marlborough: Grosvenor Rovers
  - Nelson: Rangers
  - Otago: Northern
  - Poverty Bay: Eastern Union
  - South Canterbury: West End
  - Southland: Invercargill Thistle
  - Wairarapa: Masterton Athletic
  - Wanganui: Western Suburbs
  - Wellington: Miramar Rangers
  - West Coast: Grey United

== Births ==
- 8 January: Laila Harré, politician and trade unionist.
- 13 January (in Florida, USA): Campbell Cooley, actor.
- 2 February: Sean Wade, long-distance runner.
- 3 February: Danny Morrison, cricketer.
- 22 March: Glen Denham, basketballer.
- 20 April: Sarah Bradley, television presenter.
- 26 May: Grant Bradburn, cricketer.
- 29 May: Nándor Tánczos, politician.
- 30 June: Marton Csokas, actor.
- 26 July: Nikki Payne, rower.
- 30 July: Kerry Fox, actor.
- 30 August: Teddy Tahu Rhodes, operatic bass-baritone.
- 26 September: Shane Dye, jockey.
- 22 October: Blair Hartland, cricketer.
- 7 November: Murphy Su'a, cricketer.
- 1 December: Andrew Adamson, film director.
- (in Sydney): Mick Watson, sports entrepreneur.

Category:1966 births

== Deaths ==
- 14 January: Beatrice Barth, piano teacher.
- 20 January: Bill Anderton, politician.
- 18 February: Mary Patricia Anderson, politician (MLC).
- 25 May: Fred Jones, politician.

== See also ==
- List of years in New Zealand
- Timeline of New Zealand history
- History of New Zealand
- Military history of New Zealand
- Timeline of the New Zealand environment
- Timeline of New Zealand's links with Antarctica
