= 1965 in New Zealand =

- Decades: 1940s; 1950s; 1960s; 1970s; 1980s
- See also: History of New Zealand; List of years in New Zealand; Timeline of New Zealand history

The following lists events that happened during 1965 in New Zealand.

== Population ==
- Estimated population as of 31 December: 2,663,800.
- Increase since 31 December 1964: 46,800 (1.79%).
- Males per 100 females: 100.7.

== Incumbents ==
=== Regal and viceregal ===
- Head of State – Elizabeth II
- Governor-General – Brigadier Sir Bernard Fergusson GCMG GCVO DSO OBE.

=== Government ===
The 34th Parliament of New Zealand continued, with the 2nd National government in power.

- Speaker of the House – Ronald Algie.
- Prime Minister – Keith Holyoake.
- Deputy Prime Minister – Jack Marshall.
- Minister of Finance – Harry Lake.
- Minister of Foreign Affairs – Keith Holyoake.
- Attorney-General – Ralph Hanan.
- Chief Justice — Sir Harold Barrowclough

=== Parliamentary opposition ===
- Leader of the Opposition – Arnold Nordmeyer (Labour) until 16 December, then Norman Kirk (Labour).

=== Main centre leaders ===
- Mayor of Auckland – Dove-Myer Robinson then Roy McElroy
- Mayor of Hamilton – Denis Rogers
- Mayor of Wellington – Frank Kitts
- Mayor of Christchurch – George Manning
- Mayor of Dunedin – Stuart Sidey then Russell Calvert

== Events ==
- 27 March – A Tasman Empire Airways Limited (TEAL) Lockheed L-188 Electra on a training flight crashes and catches fire on landing at Whenuapai Airport. All occupants escape with only one minor injury.
- 1 April – TEAL is renamed Air New Zealand.
- 11 April – Qantas launches the first trans-Tasman jet service, between Christchurch and Sydney using Boeing 707 aircraft.
- 13 April – An explosion and fire at the General Plastics factory in Masterton kills four people and injures four others.
- April – The HVDC Inter-Island link is completed, connecting the North Island's electricity network and the South Island's electricity network together.
- 15 May – Benmore Dam is officially opened by Prime Minister Keith Holyoake.
- 27 May – Vietnam War: Prime Minister Keith Holyoake announces New Zealand will send its first combat forces, an artillery battery, to South Vietnam.
- 20 July – A 33-hour prison riot breaks out at Mount Eden Prison, Auckland, with inmates setting fire to large parts of the prison.
- 10 August – New Zealand recognises Singapore as an independent sovereign state, one day after Singapore's expulsion from the Malaysian Federation.
- 31 August – New Zealand Australia Free Trade Agreement signed.
- 3 November – Riccarton Mall, the South Island's first indoor shopping mall, opens to shoppers.

== Arts and literature ==
- Janet Frame wins the Robert Burns Fellowship.

See 1965 in art, 1965 in literature

=== Music ===
==== New Zealand Music Awards ====
Loxene Golden Disc Ray Columbus & The Invaders – Till We Kissed

See: 1965 in music

=== Radio and television ===
- Television in the "four main centres" (Auckland, Wellington, Christchurch and Dunedin) is now broadcast seven nights a week. Broadcasting now totals 50 hours a week.
- There are 300,000 television licences.
- 28 August – Christchurch's CHTV-3 switches to the new Sugarloaf transmitter in the Port Hills.
- The broadcast relay station at Mount Studholme is commissioned, extending television coverage to South Canterbury.
- New Zealand Television Workshop awards:
  - Best Factual: Compass
  - Best Light Entertainment: In the Groove
  - Best Children's Series: Junior Magazine with Jasmine

See: 1965 in New Zealand television, 1965 in television, List of TVNZ television programming, Category:Television in New Zealand, Category:New Zealand television shows, Public broadcasting in New Zealand

=== Film ===
See: Category:1965 film awards, 1965 in film, List of New Zealand feature films, Cinema of New Zealand, Category:1965 films

== Sport ==
=== Athletics ===
Ray Puckett wins his fifth national title in the men's marathon, clocking 2:24:26.8 on 13 March in Dunedin.

=== Chess ===
- The 72nd National Chess Championships are held in Wellington. The winner is J.R. Phillips of Wellington

=== Horse racing ===
==== Harness racing ====
- New Zealand Trotting Cup – Gary Dillon
- Auckland Trotting Cup – Robin Dundee

=== Lawn bowls ===
The national outdoor lawn bowls championships are held in Auckland.

- Men's singles champion – Ron Buchan (Tui Park Bowling Club)
- Men's pair champions – Norm Lash, C.D. McGarry (skip) (Carlton Bowling Club)
- Men's fours champions – J. Miller, G. MacRae, A. Cotton, P. Jones (skip) (Otahuhu Railway Bowling Club)

=== Soccer ===
- The Chatham Cup is won by Eastern Suburbs of Auckland who beat Saint Kilda 4–1 in the final.
- Provincial league champions:
  - Bay of Plenty: Rangers
  - Buller: Granity Athletic
  - Canterbury: Christchurch City
  - Hawke's Bay: Napier Rovers
  - Manawatu: Kiwi United
  - Marlborough: Woodbourne
  - Nelson: Rangers
  - Otago: St Kilda
  - Poverty Bay: Eastern Union
  - South Canterbury: West End
  - Southland: Invercargill Thistle
  - Taranaki: Moturoa
  - Wairarapa: Masterton Athletic
  - Wanganui: Wanganui Athletic
  - Wellington: Diamond
  - West Coast: Cobden-Kohinoor
- The Northern League is formed, incorporating top teams from Northland, Auckland, Franklin and Waikato. The first League champions are Eastern Suburbs of Auckland.

== Births ==
- 10 January: John Radovonich, field hockey player.
- 11 February: Eric Rush, rugby union and rugby sevens player.
- 14 February: Zinzan Brooke, rugby player.
- 15 February: Jamie Smith, field hockey player.
- 15 March: Robyn Malcolm actor
- 4 April: Gail Jonson, swimmer.
- 8 April: Michael Jones, rugby player.
- 22 April: Carmel Clark, swimmer.
- 28 May (in Britain): Alan Henderson, bobsleigh pilot
- 28 June: Duane Mann, rugby league player.
- 29 July: Paresh Patel, field hockey player.
- 31 August: Willie Watson, cricketer.
- 1 September: Tania Roxborogh, writer.
- 7 September: Tea Ropati, rugby league player.
- 21 September: Belinda Cordwell, tennis player.
- 26 October: Ken Rutherford, cricketer.
- 5 November: Fred Beyeler, cricketer
- 24 November: Nyla Carroll, long-distance runner.
- 18 December: Anna Doig, freestyle and butterfly swimmer.
- John Leigh, actor.
- Se'e Solomona, rugby league player.
- Hilary Timmins, television presenter.

== Deaths ==
- 21 June: Thomas Hislop, Jr., Mayor of Wellington 1931-45 (in Montreal, Canada).
- 10 September: John Weeks, painter.
- 10 September: Walter Broadfoot, politician.

== See also ==
- List of years in New Zealand
- Timeline of New Zealand history
- History of New Zealand
- Military history of New Zealand
- Timeline of the New Zealand environment
- Timeline of New Zealand's links with Antarctica
