= 1968 in New Zealand =

- Decades: 1940s; 1950s; 1960s; 1970s; 1980s
- See also: History of New Zealand; List of years in New Zealand; Timeline of New Zealand history

The following lists events that happened during 1968 in New Zealand.

== Population ==
- Estimated population as of 31 December: 2,773,000.
- Increase since 31 December 1967: 28,000 (1.02%).
- Males per 100 females: 99.8 – This was the first year (other than during a major war) in which the number of females exceeded the number of males.

== Incumbents ==
=== Regal and viceregal ===
- Head of State – Elizabeth II
- Governor-General – Sir Arthur Porritt Bt GCMG GCVO CBE.

=== Government ===
The 35th Parliament of New Zealand continued, with the National government in power.

- Speaker of the House – Roy Jack.
- Prime Minister – Keith Holyoake
- Deputy Prime Minister – Jack Marshall.
- Minister of Finance – Robert Muldoon.
- Minister of Foreign Affairs – Keith Holyoake.
- Attorney-General – Ralph Hanan.
- Chief Justice — Sir Richard Wild

=== Parliamentary opposition ===
- Leader of the Opposition – Norman Kirk (Labour).
- Leader of the Social Credit Party – Vernon Cracknell

=== Main centre leaders ===
- Mayor of Auckland – Roy McElroy then Dove-Myer Robinson
- Mayor of Hamilton – Denis Rogers then Mike Minogue
- Mayor of Wellington – Frank Kitts
- Mayor of Christchurch – George Manning then Ron Guthrey
- Mayor of Dunedin – Russell John Calvert then Jim Barnes

== Events ==
- 10 April – Inter-Island ferry TEV Wahine foundered off Wellington with the loss of 53 lives.
- 24 May – A magnitude 7.1 earthquake strikes near Inangahua Junction, causing three deaths.
- 14 October – NAC commences scheduled Boeing 737-200 operations between Auckland, Wellington, Christchurch and Dunedin.
- The Southland Daily News, which had been acquired by its rival The Southland Times in 1967, ceased publication and was replaced by an evening edition of The Times. The paper was first published as Southern News and Foveaux Strait's Herald in 1861.
- The Longest Drink In Town starts being sold.

== Arts and literature ==
- Ruth Dallas wins the Robert Burns Fellowship.

See 1968 in art, 1968 in literature, Category:1968 books

=== Music ===
==== New Zealand Music Awards ====
Loxene Golden Disc Allison Durbin – I Have Loved Me A Man

See: 1968 in music

=== Radio and television ===
- Wellington television crews win the World Newsfilm Award for their coverage of the Wahine disaster.

See 1968 in television, List of TVNZ television programming, Category:Television in New Zealand, Category:New Zealand television shows, Public broadcasting in New Zealand

=== Film ===
See: Category:1968 film awards, 1968 in film, List of New Zealand feature films, Cinema of New Zealand, Category:1968 films

== Sport ==
=== Athletics ===
- Jeff Julian wins his second national title in the men's marathon, clocking 2:22:40 on 9 March in Whangārei.

=== Association football ===
- The Chatham Cup is won by Eastern Suburbs of Auckland, who beat Christchurch Technical 2–0 in the final.
- 1968 was the first year in which all three regional leagues operated, with the formation of the Southern League.
- Northern League premier division (Thompson Shield) won by Mt Wellington.
- Central League won by Western Suburbs FC
- Southern League First Division won by Christchurch City AFC

=== Chess ===
- The 75th National Chess Championship was held in Dunedin, and was won by B.R. Anderson of Christchurch.

=== Cricket ===
- Indian cricket team in New Zealand in 1967–68. The first Test was India's first win away from home, and the second Test was New Zealand's first victory over India.

=== Horse racing ===
==== Harness racing ====
- New Zealand Trotting Cup: Humphrey
- Auckland Trotting Cup: Cardinal Garrison

=== Motorsport ===
- The 1968 Tasman Series was won by Jim Clark
- The 15th 1968 New Zealand Grand Prix was won by Chris Amon

=== Olympic Games ===
==== Summer Olympics ====
Gold	Silver	Bronze	Total
1	0	2	3

- New Zealand sends a team of 52 competitors.

==== Winter Olympics ====
Gold	Silver	Bronze	Total
0	0	0	0

- New Zealand competes at the Winter Olympics for only the third time, with a team of six athletes.

=== Paralympic Games ===
==== Summer Paralympics ====
- New Zealand sends a team to the Paralympics for the first time.

Gold	Silver	Bronze	Total
1	2	1	4

=== Rugby league ===
- New Zealand competed in the 1968 Rugby League World Cup, losing all its 3 games to finish in last place.

=== Rugby union ===
- The national team of France toured New Zealand, losing all three tests and one of their nine provincial matches.

== Births ==
- 26 January: Chris Pringle, cricketer.
- January: Emma Paki, singer/songwriter.
- 29 February: Gareth Farr, composer and percussionist.
- 20 March: Lawrence Makoare, actor.
- 29 March: Lucy Lawless, actress and singer.
- 16 April (in England): Roger Twose, cricketer.
- 10 May: Craig Russ, field hockey player.
- 14 May (in Canada): Richard Tapper, swimmer.
- 25 May: Kevin Iro, rugby league player.
- 26 June: Scott Anderson, field hockey goalkeeper .
- 8 July: Shane Howarth, rugby player.
- 27 July: Cliff Curtis, actor.
- 31 July: Jenny Duck, field hockey player .
- 4 November: Lee Germon, cricketer.
- 21 August: Robbie Johnston, long-distance runner.
- 27 August: Matthew Ridge, rugby league player, rugby union player and television presenter.
- 24 October (in Papua New Guinea): Ross Anderson, swimmer.
- 18 November: Logan Edwards, rugby league player.
- 3 December: Toni Jeffs, swimmer.
- 15 December: Kirsa Jensen, missing person.
- 25 December: Jason Mackie, rugby league player.
- Greg Johnson, musician.
- Paul Moon, historian and biographer.
- Michael Parekowhai, sculptor.

Category:1968 births

== Deaths ==
- 4 June: Walter Nash, 27th Prime Minister of New Zealand. (b. 1882)
- 16 June: Alan Stuart Paterson, cartoonist. (b. 1902)
- 19 September: Barrett Crumen, seaman and swagger. (b. 1878)
- 19 November: Vivian Potter, politician. (b. 1878)

== See also ==
- List of years in New Zealand
- Timeline of New Zealand history
- History of New Zealand
- Military history of New Zealand
- Timeline of the New Zealand environment
- Timeline of New Zealand's links with Antarctica
