= 1964 in New Zealand =

- Decades: 1940s; 1950s; 1960s; 1970s; 1980s
- See also: History of New Zealand; List of years in New Zealand; Timeline of New Zealand history

The following lists events that happened during 1964 in New Zealand.

== Population ==
- Estimated population as of 31 December: 2,617,000
- Increase since 31 December 1963: 50,100 (1.95%)
- Males per 100 females: 100.8

== Incumbents ==
=== Regal and viceregal ===
- Head of State – Elizabeth II
- Governor-General – Brigadier Sir Bernard Fergusson GCMG GCVO DSO OBE.

=== Government ===
The 34th New Zealand Parliament commenced, with the second National Government in power.

- Speaker of the House – Ronald Algie .
- Prime Minister – Keith Holyoake
- Deputy Prime Minister – Jack Marshall.
- Minister of Finance – Harry Lake.
- Minister of Foreign Affairs – Keith Holyoake.
- Attorney-General – Ralph Hanan.
- Chief Justice — Sir Harold Barrowclough

=== Parliamentary opposition ===
- Leader of the Opposition – Walter Nash (Labour) until 31 March, then Arnold Nordmeyer (Labour).

=== Main centre leaders ===
- Mayor of Auckland – Dove-Myer Robinson
- Mayor of Hamilton – Denis Rogers
- Mayor of Wellington – Frank Kitts
- Mayor of Christchurch – George Manning
- Mayor of Dunedin – Stuart Sidey

== Events ==
- 1 January – Massey University College of Manawatu becomes Massey University of Manawatu due to the Massey University of Manawatu Act 1963.
- 27 February – the 1.97 km (1.22 mi) Lyttelton road tunnel, at the time New Zealand's longest road tunnel, opens to traffic.
- 1 April – The Government unveils plans for the new executive wing of Parliament, demolishing Government House and constructing a "beehive"-shaped building in its place.
- May – The last electric tramway system of New Zealand closes.
- 30 May – The Marsden Point Oil Refinery opens.
- June – The New Zealand Army Detachment arrives in Vietnam during the Vietnam War.
- 21–27 June – The Beatles tour New Zealand.
- 28 August – Emergency number 111 is introduced in Christchurch.
- November – The Continental Shelf Act 1964 passes into law.
- 21 December – The last whale is caught for the whaling industry, off the Kaikōura coast, due to a low level of whales.
- Alexandra experiences record low rainfall with only 212 mm (8.3 in) falling in the town, the driest calendar year recorded in New Zealand (as of March 2023).

== Arts and literature ==
- Maurice Gee wins the Robert Burns Fellowship.

See 1964 in art, 1964 in literature

=== New books ===
- Washday at the Pa

See Category:1964 books

=== Music ===
- See 1964 in music
- 21–27 June: The Beatles tour New Zealand.

=== Radio and television ===
- Coronation Street was shown for the first time on New Zealand television on AKTV2 in the Auckland region on Thursday 14 May, running from 8.25 pm to 8.52 pm. As television was not then networked throughout New Zealand, Wellington (WNTV1), Christchurch (CHTV3) and Dunedin (DNTV2) followed in June and July; on Tuesday in Wellington and Christchurch and Thursday in Dunedin.
- Television licences reach 168,000.
- Broadcast relay stations at Mount Erin, Kuriwao Hill and Mount Hedgehope are commissioned, extending television coverage to Hawke's Bay, South Otago and Southland.
- A Māori broadcasting section of NZBC is established.
- NZBC begins plans for the Avalon studios.
- New Zealand Television Workshop awards:
  - Best Factual: Focus
  - Best Light Entertainment: Music Hall
  - Best Documentary: The Distant Shore

See: 1964 in television, List of TVNZ television programming, Category:Television in New Zealand, Category:New Zealand television shows, Public broadcasting in New Zealand.

=== Film ===
- Runaway

See: Category:1964 film awards, 1964 in film, List of New Zealand feature films, Cinema of New Zealand, Category:1964 films

== Sport ==
=== Athletics ===
- Peter Snell – Olympic Gold Medal, Men's 800 metres
- Peter Snell – Olympic Gold Medal, Men's 1500 metres
- John Davies – Olympic Bronze Medal, Men's 1500 metres
- Marise Chamberlain – Olympic Bronze Medal, Women's 800 metres
- Ray Puckett wins his fourth national title in the men's marathon, clocking 2:17:38.6 on 7 March in Lower Hutt.

=== Chess ===
- The 71st National Chess Championship was held in Auckland, and was won by R.A. Court of Wellington.

=== Cricket ===
- New Zealand cricket team
- Plunket Shield was won by Auckland (1963-1964 season)

=== Horse racing ===
==== Harness racing ====
- New Zealand Trotting Cup – Cairnbrae
- Auckland Trotting Cup – Lordship

=== Lawn bowls ===
The national outdoor lawn bowls championships are held in Dunedin.

- Men's singles champion – Ron Buchan (Tui Park Bowling Club)
- Men's pair champions – W.D. Scott, G.P. Ogilvie (skip) (Cromwell Bowling Club)
- Men's fours champions – C.T. Bateman, J.M. Clarke, R.D. Barron, H. Deavoll (skip) (Sydenham Bowling Club)

=== Netball ===
- Silver Ferns

=== Olympic Games ===
==== Summer Olympics ====
Gold	Silver	Bronze	Total
3	0	2	5

- New Zealand sends a team of 64 competitors.

==== Winter Olympics ====
- New Zealand does not participate in the 1964 Winter Olympics.

=== Rugby league ===
- New Zealand national rugby league team
- Rugby League World Cup

=== Rugby Union ===
- Category:All Blacks
- Bledisloe Cup: New Zealand beat Australia by 2 tests to 1
- Ranfurly Shield: Taranaki was successful in all defences, with 8 wins and 1 draw.

=== Soccer ===
- The Chatham Cup is won by Mount Roskill who beat King Edward Technical College Old Boys 3–1 in the final.
- Provincial league champions:
  - Auckland: Blockhouse Bay
  - Bay of Plenty: Kahukura
  - Buller: Waimangaroa United
  - Canterbury: Christchurch City
  - Franklin: Papatoetoe
  - Hawke's Bay: Napier Rovers
  - Manawatu: Thistle
  - Marlborough: Woodbourne
  - Nelson: Rangers
  - Northland: Otangarei United
  - Otago: Northern
  - Poverty Bay: Eastern Union
  - South Canterbury: West End
  - Southland: Invercargill Thistle
  - Taranaki: Moturoa, Old Boys (shared)
  - Waikato: Hamilton
  - Wairarapa: YMCA
  - Wanganui: Wanganui United
  - Wellington: Diamond
  - West Coast: Grey United

=== Yachting ===
- Helmer Pedersen, and Earle Wells – Olympic Gold Medal, Men's Flying Dutchman class

== Births ==
- 10 February: John Campbell, broadcaster
- 22 February: Brad McGann, filmmaker (died 2007)
- 1 March: Anne Judkins, race walker
- 23 March: John Mitchell, rugby player and coach
- 7 April: Russell Crowe, actor
- 12 May: Matthew Palmer, legal academic
- 24 May: Aaron Craig,
- 27 May: Joel Hayward, strategic studies scholar and poet
- 6 June: Marise Wipani, actress
- 10 June:
  - Andrew Niccol, film director
  - Tony Martin, comedian.
- 12 June: Lorraine Downes, beauty queen
- 18 June: Simon Dallow, newsreader
- 19 June: Michael Kenny, heavyweight boxer
- 20 June: Steve Braunias, journalist
- July: Shayne Carter, musician
- 11 August: Grant Waite, golfer
- 27 August: Lynley Hannen, rower
- 3 October: Shane Cotton, painter
- 23 October: David Penfold, field hockey player
- 29 October: Anthony Mosse, swimmer.
- 3 November: Bryan Young, cricketer
- 5 December: Brent Todd, rugby league footballer
- 14 December: Rebecca Gibney, actress
- 16 December: John Kirwan, rugby footballer and coach
- 24 December: Nick Smith, politician
- Unknown:
  - Martin Devlin, sports broadcaster
  - Glenn Colquhoun, poet

== Deaths ==
- 10 June : Harold Caro, Mayor of Hamilton.
- 12 December: John Norman Massey, MP and politician.

== See also ==
- List of years in New Zealand
- Timeline of New Zealand history
- History of New Zealand
- Military history of New Zealand
- Timeline of the New Zealand environment
- Timeline of New Zealand's links with Antarctica
