= 1961 in New Zealand =

- Decades: 1940s; 1950s; 1960s; 1970s; 1980s
- See also: History of New Zealand; List of years in New Zealand; Timeline of New Zealand history

The following lists events that happened during 1961 in New Zealand.

== Population ==
- Estimated population as of 31 December: 2,461,300.
- Increase since 31 December 1960: 57,700 (2.40%).
- Males per 100 females: 101.2.

== Incumbents ==
=== Regal and viceregal ===
- Head of State – Elizabeth II
- Governor-General – The Viscount Cobham GCMG TD.

=== Government ===
- Speaker of the House – Ronald Algie.
- Prime Minister – Keith Holyoake
- Deputy Prime Minister – Jack Marshall.
- Minister of Finance – Harry Lake.
- Minister of Foreign Affairs – Keith Holyoake.
- Attorney-General – Ralph Hanan.
- Chief Justice — Sir Harold Barrowclough

=== Parliamentary opposition ===
- Leader of the Opposition – Walter Nash (Labour)

=== Main centre leaders ===
- Mayor of Auckland – Dove-Myer Robinson
- Mayor of Hamilton – Denis Rogers
- Mayor of Wellington – Frank Kitts
- Mayor of Christchurch – George Manning
- Mayor of Dunedin – Stuart Sidey

== Events ==
=== January ===
- The Ohakuri hydroelectric power plant starts operation.

=== April ===
- 23 April – Emergency number 111 is introduced in Wellington.

=== June ===
- 1 June – Television begin transmission in Christchurch

=== July ===
- 1 July – Television begin transmission in Wellington.

=== October ===
- 12 October – Ten National MPs voted with the Opposition to remove capital punishment for murder from the Crimes Bill that the Second National Government had introduced, by a vote of 41 to 30.

== Arts and literature ==
- John Caselburg wins the Robert Burns Fellowship.

See 1961 in art, 1961 in literature

=== Music ===
See: 1961 in music

=== Radio and television ===
- Auckland television is extended to seven nights a week, two and a half hours a night. On 4 April, Auckland television went commercial.
- Television transmission began in Christchurch (a year later than Auckland) on 1 June. Wellington followed four weeks later, on 1 July.
- 2 December – Radio station 1YW launches in Hamilton on 1140 kHz.
- 5 December – Radio station 3YW launches in Westport on 1460 kHz.

See: 1961 in New Zealand television, 1961 in television, List of TVNZ television programming, Public broadcasting in New Zealand & Category:Television in New Zealand.

=== Film ===
See: Category:1961 film awards, 1961 in film, List of New Zealand feature films, Cinema of New Zealand, Category:1961 films

== Sport ==
=== Athletics ===
- Barry Magee wins his first national title in the men's marathon, clocking 2:18:54.2 on 4 March in Christchurch.

=== Chess ===
- The 68th National Chess Championship was held in Auckland, and was won by Ortvin Sarapu of Auckland (his 6th title).

=== Cricket ===
- New Zealand tours South Africa (spanning December 1961 – February 1962) and drew the 5-Test series 2-2:
  - 8–12 December 1961, Durban: 1st Test. SA won by 30 runs (SA 292 + 149, NZ 245 and 166)
  - 26–29 December 1961, Johannesburg: 2nd Test Drawn (SA 322 + 178/6 decl, NZ 223 + 165/4)
  - 1–4 January 1962, Cape Town: 3rd Test. NZ won by 72 runs (NZ 385 + 212/9 decl., SA 190 + 335)
  - 2–5 February 1962, Johannesburg: 4th test. SA won by innings & 51 runs (NZ 164 + 249, SA 464)
  - 16–20 February 1962, Port Elizabeth: 5th Test: NZ won by 40 runs (NZ 275 + 228, SA 190 + 273)

=== Horse racing ===
==== Harness racing ====
- New Zealand Trotting Cup – Invicta
- Auckland Trotting Cup – Cardigan Bay

=== Lawn bowls ===
The national outdoor lawn bowls championships are held in Auckland.

- Men's singles champion – J.H. Rabone (Auckland Bowling Club)
- Men's pair champions – N. Posa, M. Vulinovich (skip) (Oratia Bowling Club)
- Men's fours champions – J. Hammersley, L.N. Harris, R.S. Eves, M.J. Squire (skip) (West End Bowling Club, New Plymouth)

=== Rugby union ===
- France tour New Zealand, losing all three Test matches:
  - 22 July, Eden Park, Auckland: New Zealand 13 – 6 France
  - 5 August, Athletic Park, Wellington: New Zealand 5 – 3 France
  - 19 August, lancaster Park, Christchurch: New Zealand 32 – 3 France

=== Soccer ===
- An English FA XI tours New Zealand, handing out two heavy defeats to the national men's team.
  - 5 June, Wellington: NZ 0 – 8 English FA XI
  - 10 June, Auckland: NZ 1 – 6 English FA XI
- The Chatham Cup was won by Dunedin team Northern who beat North Shore United 2 – 0 in the final.
- Provincial league champions:
  - Auckland: North Shore United
  - Bay of Plenty: Kawerau Town
  - Buller: Waimangaroa United
  - Canterbury: Technical OB
  - Franklin: Manurewa AFC
  - Hawke's Bay: Napier Rovers
  - Manawatu: Ohakea
  - Marlborough: Spartans
  - Nelson: Rangers
  - Northland: Kamo Swifts
  - Otago: Northern
  - Poverty Bay: Eastern Union
  - South Canterbury: Thistle
  - Southland: Invercargill Thistle
  - Taranaki: Moturoa
  - Waikato: Hamilton Technical OB
  - Wairarapa: YMCA
  - Wanganui: New Settlers
  - Wellington: Northern
  - West Coast: Grey United

== Births ==
- 9 May: Michael Mayell, entrepreneur and founder of Cookie Time.
- 10 May: Blyth Tait, equestrian.
- 26 June: David White, cricketer.
- 9 August: John Key, politician, 38th Prime Minister of New Zealand (2008–2016)
- 12 August: Mark Priest, cricketer.
- 5 October: David Kirk, rugby player and business executive.
- 5 October: Derek Stirling, cricketer.
- 10 October: Gary Hurring, swimmer.
- 31 October: Peter Jackson, filmmaker.
- 15 November: Hugh McGahan, rugby league footballer.
- 28 November: Bruce Derlin, tennis player.
- 9 December: Ian Wright, rower.
- 30 December: Bill English, politician, 39th Prime Minister of New Zealand (2016–2017)
- Michael Hight, painter.
- Willie Jackson, politician and broadcaster.
- Grant Lingard, artist.
- Anthony McCarten, playwright and novelist.

Category:1961 births

== Deaths ==
- 25 June: Jack Lamason, cricketer.
- 19 July: Mary Dreaver, politician.
- 5 August: Sidney Holland, 25th Prime Minister of New Zealand.
- 8 November: Frederick Vincent Ellis, artist.
- 14 December: William Duncan, rugby union player.

== See also ==
- List of years in New Zealand
- Timeline of New Zealand history
- History of New Zealand
- Military history of New Zealand
- Timeline of the New Zealand environment
- Timeline of New Zealand's links with Antarctica
