= Neil Cherry =

New Zealand environmental scientist

Neil Cherry ONZM
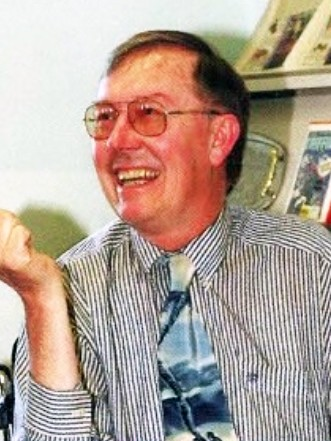
- Born: Neil James Cherry; 29 September 1946; Christchurch, New Zealand
- Died: 24 May 2003 (aged 56)
- Education: University of Canterbury
- Spouse: Gae Denise Miller (m. 1968)
- Children: 2
- Scientific career
- Fields: Environmental science
- Workplaces: Lincoln University
- Thesis: A study of wind and waves (1971)
- Doctoral advisor: R.G.T. Bennett; G.J. Fraser

Neil James Cherry ONZM (29 September 1946 – 24 May 2003) was a New Zealand environmental scientist.

== Biography ==
=== Early life and family ===
Cherry was born in Christchurch on 29 September 1946. His parents were James Conrad Cherry and Mona Hartley, who had married in 1940. Cherry could trace his ancestry back to the Cressy, one of the First Four Ships that started the settlement of Canterbury.

Cherry was educated at Christchurch Technical College, and went on to study physics at the University of Canterbury, graduating BSc(Hons) in 1969 and PhD in 1971. His doctoral thesis, supervised by R.G.T. Bennett and G.J. Fraser, was titled A study of wind and waves.

In 1968, Cherry married Gae Denise Miller, and the couple went on to have two children.

=== Career ===
Cherry specialised most recently in the effects of electromagnetic radiation on human health, following his earlier work in meteorology and wind energy.

=== Politics ===
At the 1987 election he stood for the Labour Party in the Christchurch electorate of Fendalton. He boosted Labour's vote by 6.73%, but fell 311 votes short of defeating the incumbent MP Philip Burdon. Ahead of the 1990 election he put himself forward to replace former Prime Minister Geoffrey Palmer as the Labour candidate for Christchurch Central. He lost out on the Labour nomination to Lianne Dalziel but was, by his own estimation, the second preference and pledged to campaign for Dalziel.

Cherry served as a Councillor on the Canterbury Regional Council (Environment Canterbury) from 1992.

=== Later life and death ===
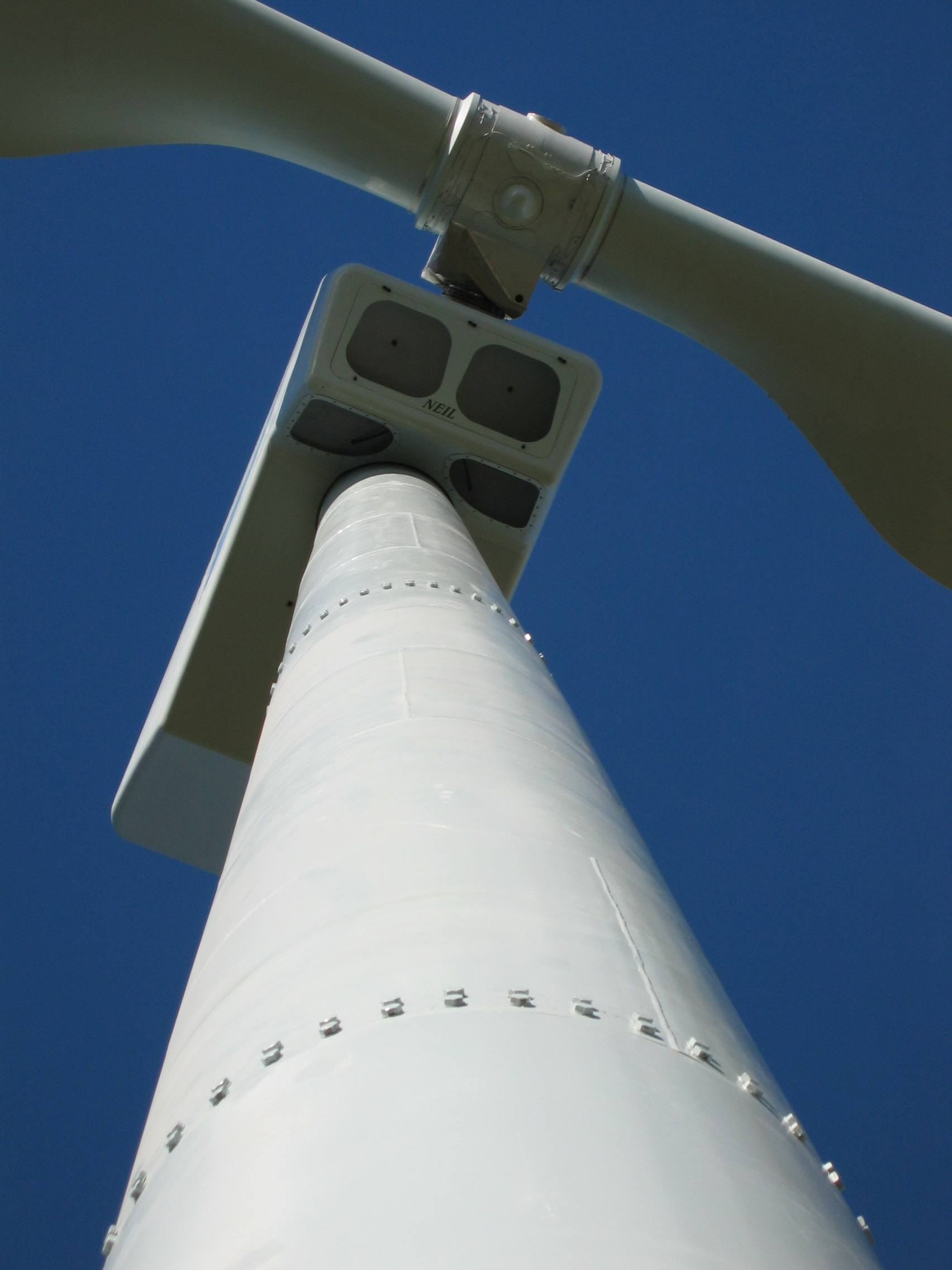
Windflow Technology's prototype windmill was named "Neil" to honour Cherry

Cherry was diagnosed with motor neurone disease in 2001, and became increasingly immobile until his death in 2003.

== Honours and awards ==
In 1990, Cherry was awarded the New Zealand 1990 Commemoration Medal. In the 2002 New Year Honours, Cherry was appointed an Officer of the New Zealand Order of Merit, for services to science, education and the community.

== Selected works ==
- Cherry, Neil (2002). "Schumann Resonances, a plausible biophysical mechanism for the human health effects of Solar". Natural Hazards. 26 (3): 279–331. doi:10.1023/A:1015637127504. S2CID 14949493.
- White, Warren B.; Cherry, Neil J. (1999). "Influence of the Antarctic Circumpolar Wave upon New Zealand temperature and precipitation during autumn–winter". Journal of Climate. 12 (4): 960–976. Bibcode:1999JCli...12..960W. doi:10.1175/1520-0442(1999)012<0960:IOTACW>2.0.CO;2. hdl:10182/3714. S2CID 52108394.
- Cooper, Duncan; Hemmings, Karla; Saunders, Pat; Cherry, Neil; Dolk, Helen (2001). "Re:"Cancer incidence near radio and television transmitters in Great Britain. I. Sutton Coldfield transmitter; II. All high power transmitters"". American Journal of Epidemiology. 153 (2): 202–205. doi:10.1093/aje/153.2.202. PMID 11159167.
- Trought, M.C.T.; Howell, G.S.; Cherry, Neil J. (1999). Practical considerations for reducing frost damage in vineyards (PDF). Report to New Zealand Winegrowers.
