= Anthony Thornton =

Anthony Thornton may refer to:

- Anthony Thornton (field hockey) (born 1967), New Zealand field hockey player
- Anthony Thornton (politician) (1814–1904), U.S. representative from Illinois
- Anthony Thornton (writer) (born 1971), author of The Libertines: Bound Together

== See also ==
- Tony Thornton, boxer
