= Talmont =

Talmont may refer to:

- Talmont-sur-Gironde, a commune in France
- Talmont-Saint-Hilaire, a commune in France
- Château de Talmont, a medieval castle in the Talmont-Saint-Hilaire commune, France
- Talmont (surname)
