= Paresh Patel =

Paresh Patel can refer to:

- Paresh Patel (cricketer) (born 1985), Indian cricketer
- Paresh Patel (field hockey) (born 1965), New Zealand field hockey player
