= Talmont (surname) =

Talmont is a surname. Notable people with the surname include:

- Konrad Talmont-Kamiński (born 1971), Polish-Australian philosopher
- Pierre Talmont (born 1977), French footballer
- Ralph Talmont (born 1963), Australian/Polish photographer, multimedia producer and entrepreneur
- Leonard Talmont, Lithuanian politician of Polish extraction, member of parliament
