= 1967 Fendalton by-election =

New Zealand by-election

← 1966 general	15 April 1967	1969 general →
- Turnout: 15,213 (73.56%)
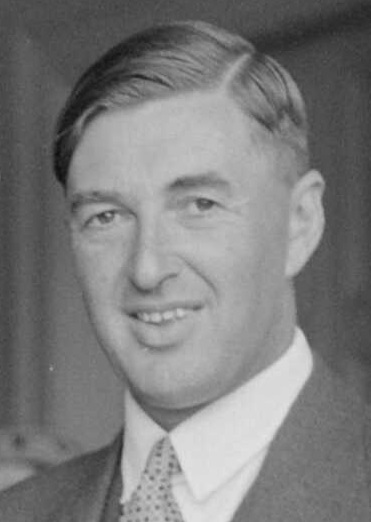

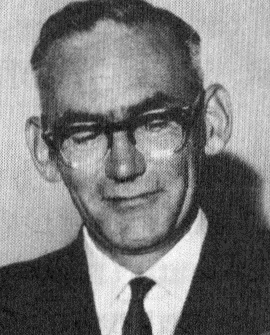
Candidate	Eric Holland	Bruce Barclay
Party	National	Labour
Popular vote	7,024	6,738
Percentage	46.17	44.29
MP before election
Harry Lake
National
Elected MP
Eric Holland
National

The Fendalton by-election of 1967 was a by-election for the electorate of Fendalton on 15 April 1967 during the 35th New Zealand Parliament.

It was held the same day as another by-election in Petone.

== Background ==
The by-election resulted from the death of the previous member the Hon Harry Lake on 21 February 1967; Lake had been Minister of Finance since 1960, a rapid rise to an important ministerial post. He died suddenly of a heart attack aged 55 years.

== Candidates ==
Labour

There were two candidates for the Labour Party nomination.

- Bruce Barclay, a member of the Lyttelton Harbour Board who was Labour's Fendalton candidate in 1963 and 1966
- Brian Brooks, a union secretary and industrial law lecturer at the University of Canterbury

Barclay was selected. He had contested Fendalton for Labour at both of the previous two general elections. His father Jim Barclay was a Labour MP from 1935 to 1943 and his cousin Ron Barclay had been elected MP for New Plymouth in 1966.

National

There were four nominees for the National Party candidacy.

- Joseph Richard "Dick" Dawson, A doctor who was National's candidate for Avon in 1966
- Tom Flint, a former Christchurch City Councillor who contested Christchurch Central in 1960 and Lyttelton in 1963
- Helen Garrett, a Citizens' Association candidate for the Christchurch City Council in 1965 and National's candidate for Sydenham in 1966
- Eric Holland, past chairman of the Fendalton Electorate Committee and deputy-chairman National's Canterbury-Westland division

Holland was chosen as the National Party's candidate after winning a ballot of 180 party members from the electorate. His father Sidney Holland had previously represented Fendalton from 1946 until 1957 and was Prime Minister from 1949 to 1957 when he retired.

Social Credit

The Social Credit Party selected Joseph John Forster, an employee at the North Canterbury Hospital Board, as its candidate. Forster had contested Fendalton for Social Credit at the 1960 and 1966 elections.

Others

The Liberal Party also contemplated standing a candidate, though the party executive ultimately decided against it.

== Results ==
The following table gives the election results:

1967 Fendalton by-election
Party	Candidate	Votes	%	±%
National	Eric Holland	7,024	46.17	
Labour	Bruce Barclay	6,738	44.29	+6.12
Social Credit	John Forster	1,451	9.53	−0.93
Majority		286	1.87	
Turnout		15,213	73.56	−12.15
Registered electors		20,681		
National hold		Swing		

The by-election was won by Eric Holland, also of the National Party. Holland was the son of former prime minister Sidney Holland. Despite being a safe National seat, the election night results had a 67-vote majority to Labour's candidate Bruce Barclay, the shock result prompted Leader of the Opposition Norman Kirk to declare that National had lost its mandate to govern. However after 1,300 special votes were counted National did manage to hold the seat by just 286 votes a swing of over 5% to Labour.
