= Fendalton (electorate) =

Fendalton is a former New Zealand parliamentary electorate. It existed during two periods between 1946 and 1996. The electorate was in the western suburbs of Christchurch, New Zealand. Fendalton is an expensive suburb, and was always represented by the National Party.

== Population centres ==
The 1941 New Zealand census had been postponed due to World War II, so the 1946 electoral redistribution had to take ten years of population growth and movements into account. The North Island gained a further two electorates from the South Island due to faster population growth. The abolition of the country quota through the Electoral Amendment Act, 1945 reduced the number and increased the size of rural electorates. None of the existing electorates remained unchanged, 27 electorates were abolished, eight former electorates were re-established, and 19 electorates were created for the first time, including Fendalton. To the west of the Main North Line, its area came from the Riccarton electorate. To the east of the Main North Line, the electorate's area had previously belonged to the Christchurch North and Christchurch South electorates.

In the 1952 electoral redistribution, the Fendalton electorate expanded to the north and north-west, gaining area from the Selwyn electorate, and lost some area in the southern part of the central city. In the 1957 electoral redistribution, the boundaries were adjusted significantly. The southern part of the Fendalton electorate was lost to the Christchurch Central electorate. In the southwest, large areas were transferred to the Riccarton electorate. In the north-west, the electorate was extended as far as Harewood. In the north-east, Papanui was gained from the St Albans electorate. In the 1962 electoral redistribution, some boundary adjustments were carried out in the Papanui area.

Through an amendment in the Electoral Act in 1965, the number of electorates in the South Island was fixed at 25, an increase of one since the 1962 electoral redistribution. It was accepted that through the more rapid population growth in the North Island, the number of its electorates would continue to increase, and to keep proportionality, three new electorates were allowed for in the 1967 electoral redistribution for the next election. In the North Island, five electorates were newly created and one electorate was reconstituted while three electorates were abolished. In the South Island, three electorates were newly created and one electorate was reconstituted while three electorates were abolished (including Fendalton). The overall effect of the required changes was highly disruptive to existing electorates, with all but three electorates having their boundaries altered. Fendalton's area went to the Papanui and Riccarton electorates. These changes came into effect through the 1969 election.

== History ==
Sidney Holland was the electorate's first representative. Holland had since the 1935 election held the Christchurch North electorate. He was Prime Minister from 1949 to 1957 while representing the electorate. He retired from Parliament in 1957 due to declining health.

Holland was succeeded by Jack Watts in the 1957 election. Watts had since 1943 represented various Christchurch electorates. He retired at the end of the parliamentary term in 1960.

The electorate was abolished in 1969, when Eric Holland went to the nearby Riccarton electorate. It was then recreated in 1978, and abolished in 1996, for the first MMP election.

=== Members of Parliament ===
The Fendalton electorate was represented by five Members of Parliament:

Key

National

Election	Winner
1946 election	Sidney Holland
1949 election	Sidney Holland
1951 election	Sidney Holland
1954 election	Sidney Holland
1957 election	Jack Watts
1960 election	Harry Lake
1963 election	Harry Lake
1966 election	Harry Lake
1967 by-election	Eric Holland
(Electorate abolished 1969–1978; see Papanui and Riccarton)
1978 election	Eric Holland (2nd period)
1981 election	Philip Burdon
1984 election	Philip Burdon
1987 election	Philip Burdon
1990 election	Philip Burdon
1993 election	Philip Burdon
(Electorate abolished in 1996; see Ilam)

== Election results ==
=== 1993 election ===
1993 general election: Fendalton
Party	Candidate	Votes	%	±%
National	Philip Burdon	10,767	51.75	−1.71
Labour	Tony Day	5,785	27.80	−1.28
Alliance	Christopher St Johanser	3,341	16.06	
Christian Heritage	Rosemary Pearson	279	1.34	−0.98
Natural Law	Warwick Jones	109	0.52	
Majority		4,982	23.94	−0.43
Turnout		20,802	86.23	−0.05
Registered electors		24,122		

=== 1990 election ===
1990 general election: Fendalton
Party	Candidate	Votes	%	±%
National	Philip Burdon	10,950	53.46	+4.13
Labour	Tony Day	5,957	29.08	
Green	Don Robertson	1,848	9.02	
NewLabour	Eric Gamble	1,002	4.89	
Christian Heritage	Rosemary Pearson	477	2.32	
McGillicuddy Serious	Mark Muir	130	0.63	
Democrats	Dan Bond	117	0.57	
Majority		4,993	24.37	+22.91
Turnout		20,481	86.28	−4.39
Registered electors		23,737		

=== 1987 election ===
1987 general election: Fendalton
Party	Candidate	Votes	%	±%
National	Philip Burdon	10,482	49.33	+1.57
Labour	Neil Cherry	10,171	47.87	
Democrats	Bill Smith	366	1.72	
Breakfast Party	Mary-Jane Tomasi	104	0.48	
Independent Labour	Alan Faloon	62	0.29	
Wizard Party	Philip Day	61	0.28	
Majority		311	1.46	−5.16
Turnout		21,246	90.67	−1.53
Registered electors		23,430		

=== 1984 election ===
1984 general election: Fendalton
Party	Candidate	Votes	%	±%
National	Philip Burdon	10,506	47.76	−0.42
Labour	Murray Dobson	9,049	41.14	
NZ Party	Robert Radley	2,445	11.11	
Social Credit	Sandra Wright	316	1.43	
Values	Warren Thomson	107	0.48	
Independent	Michael Ellims	22	0.10	
Majority		1,457	6.62	+0.91
Turnout		21,995	92.20	+1.44
Registered electors		23,854		

=== 1981 election ===
1981 general election: Fendalton
Party	Candidate	Votes	%	±%
National	Philip Burdon	9,772	48.18	
Labour	David Close	8,614	42.47	+4.13
Social Credit	Louise Moore	1,894	9.33	
Majority		1,158	5.71	
Turnout		20,280	90.76	+28.66
Registered electors		22,343		

=== 1978 election ===
1978 general election: Fendalton
Party	Candidate	Votes	%	±%
National	Eric Holland	9,480	48.30	
Labour	David Close	7,524	38.34	
Social Credit	Don Parlane	1,603	8.16	
Values	Don Offwood	1,017	5.18	
Majority		1,956	9.96	
Turnout		19,624	62.10	
Registered electors		31,599		

=== 1967 by-election ===
1967 Fendalton by-election
Party	Candidate	Votes	%	±%
National	Eric Holland	7,024	46.17	
Labour	Bruce Barclay	6,738	44.29	+6.12
Social Credit	John Forster	1,451	9.53	−0.93
Majority		286	1.87	
Turnout		15,213	73.56	−12.15
Registered electors		20,681		
National hold		Swing		

=== 1966 election ===
1966 general election: Fendalton
Party	Candidate	Votes	%	±%
National	Harry Lake	8,850	51.35	−6.72
Labour	Bruce Barclay	6,579	38.17	−2.84
Social Credit	John Forster	1,803	10.46	
Majority		2,271	13.17	−3.88
Turnout		17,232	85.71	−3.74
Registered electors		20,103		

=== 1963 election ===
1963 general election: Fendalton
Party	Candidate	Votes	%	±%
National	Harry Lake	9,329	58.07	+2.53
Labour	Bruce Barclay	6,589	41.01	
Communist	William John Collins	145	0.90	
Majority		2,740	17.05	
Turnout		16,063	89.45	−1.02
Registered electors		17,957		

=== 1960 election ===
1960 general election: Fendalton
Party	Candidate	Votes	%	±%
National	Harry Lake	9,500	55.54	
Labour	Bill Rowling	6,778	39.62	
Social Credit	John Forster	826	4.82	
Majority		2,722	15.91	
Turnout		17,104	90.47	−2.90
Registered electors		18,904		

=== 1957 election ===
1957 general election: Fendalton
Party	Candidate	Votes	%	±%
National	Jack Watts	8,307	54.39	
Labour	Lawrence Godfrey Graham White	6,140	40.20	
Social Credit	Allan Edward Collins	824	5.39	−10.15
Majority		2,167	14.19	
Turnout		15,271	93.37	+1.87
Registered electors		16,354		

=== 1954 election ===
1954 general election: Fendalton
Party	Candidate	Votes	%	±%
National	Sidney Holland	7,852	56.17	−10.98
Labour	Roy Henry McDonald	3,952	28.27	
Social Credit	Allan Edward Collins	2,173	15.54	
Majority		3,900	27.90	−6.40
Turnout		13,977	91.50	+5.43
Registered electors		15,275		

=== 1951 election ===
1951 general election: Fendalton
Party	Candidate	Votes	%	±%
National	Sidney Holland	8,546	67.15	+3.13
Labour	Philip John Alley	4,180	32.84	
Majority		4,366	34.30	+4.07
Turnout		12,726	86.07	−7.43
Registered electors		14,784		

=== 1949 election ===
1949 general election: Fendalton
Party	Candidate	Votes	%	±%
National	Sidney Holland	8,632	64.02	+2.58
Labour	Robert Newman	4,286	31.78	
Independent Liberal	John Henry Gilmour	565	4.19	
Majority		4,076	30.23	+7.35
Turnout		13,483	93.50	+2.35
Registered electors		14,419		

=== 1946 election ===
1946 general election: Fendalton
Party	Candidate	Votes	%	±%
National	Sidney Holland	8,065	61.44	
Labour	Alan Williams	5,061	38.55	
Majority		3,004	22.88	
Turnout		13,126	91.15	
Registered electors		14,399		
