= Eric Holland =

New Zealand politician (1921–1989)

The Honourable Eric Holland
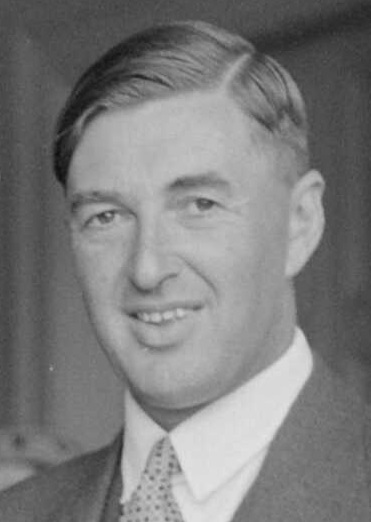
- Holland in 1958

8th Minister of Housing
- In office 8 March 1977 – 13 December 1978
- Prime Minister: Robert Muldoon
- Preceded by: George Gair
- Succeeded by: Derek Quigley
- In office 9 February 1972 – 8 December 1972
- Prime Minister: Jack Marshall
- Preceded by: John Rae
- Succeeded by: Bill Fraser

Member of the New Zealand Parliament for Fendalton Riccarton (1969–1978)
- In office 15 April 1967 – 28 November 1981
- Preceded by: Harry Lake
- Succeeded by: Philip Burdon

Personal details
- Born: 28 June 1921
- Died: 1 July 1989 (aged 68)
- Party: National
- Spouses: Janet Mary Wills (m. 1944; div. 1970) Nancy Mary Nilner (m. 1972; died 1981)
- Children: 3

Eric Sidney Fostyn Holland (28 June 1921 – 1 July 1989) was a New Zealand politician who served as an elected member of the House of Representatives from 1967 to 1981 for the National Party and as a Cabinet Minister in the second and third National governments.

== Biography ==
=== Early life and career ===
Holland was born in 1921; he was the son of former prime minister and National Party leader Sir Sidney Holland. He received his education at Elmwood School and St. Andrew's College in Christchurch. Holland fought in WW2 in the Pacific and in Italy. He was president of the Canterbury Savings Bank in 1965 and 1966, and president of the Associated Trustee Savings Banks of New Zealand in 1966 and 1967.

In 1944, Holland married Janet Mary Wills, the daughter of Wilfrid John Wills. They had one son and two daughters, and divorced in 1970. In 1972, he married Nancy Mary Nilner.

=== Political career ===
New Zealand Parliament
Years	Term	Electorate	Party
1967–1969	35th	Fendalton	National
1969–1972	36th	Riccarton	National
1972–1975	37th	Riccarton	National
1975–1978	38th	Riccarton	National
1978–1981	39th	Fendalton	National

Holland was involved in the National Party and became chairman of the Fendalton Electorate Committee and deputy-chairman National's Canterbury-Westland division.

The death of Harry Lake in early 1967 caused a 15 April 1967 by-election in Fendalton, the electorate once held by his father. Holland entered contention and won the National Party nomination. He defeated Labour's Bruce Barclay in the election. The polling night results in the Fendalton by-election showed a 67-vote majority to Barclay, however after special votes were counted National did manage to hold the seat by just 286 votes, a swing of over 5% to Labour. This was a surprise result in a safe National seat. The Fendalton electorate was abolished in 1969, and Holland won election in the Riccarton electorate. He represented this electorate for three parliamentary terms until 1978, when Riccarton was in turn abolished. In the 1978 election, he returned to the reinstated Fendalton constituency for the 1978–1981 period, following which he retired.

At the end of the Second National Government Prime Minister Jack Marshall appointed Holland as Minister of Housing from 9 February to 8 December 1972 when the government was defeated. During National's unsuccessful 1972 election campaign Labour's housing policy of enabling home loans through the State Advances Corporation for people carrying out renovations on state houses to bring them up to standards received an unusually large amount of interest. Two days later it prompted Holland to announce the government would introduce an identical policy to Labour's.

After National's defeat Marshall retained him in the same portfolio as Shadow Minister of Housing from 1973 to 1974. When Robert Muldoon replaced Marshall as party leader he instead designated Shadow Minister of Energy and Electricity from 1974 to 1975.

During the Third National Government under Muldoon, Holland was appointed Minister of Energy Resources, Minister of Electricity, and Minister of Mines (all 12 December 1975 – 8 March 1977), and then once again as Minister of Housing (8 March 1977 – 13 December 1978). His portfolio shift back to Housing was precipitated by him suffering a stroke.

=== Later life and death ===
Holland died on 1 July 1989.

== Notes ==
Political offices
Preceded by George Gair	Minister of Housing; 1977–1978 1972	Succeeded by Derek Quigley
Preceded by John Rae	Minister of Housing; 1977–1978 1972	Succeeded by Bill Fraser
New Zealand Parliament
Preceded by Harry Lake	Member of Parliament for Fendalton; 1967–1969 1978–1981	In abeyance Title next held by himself
In abeyance Title last held by himself	Member of Parliament for Fendalton; 1967–1969 1978–1981	Succeeded by Philip Burdon
Preceded by Mick Connelly	Member of Parliament for Riccarton; 1969–1978	Constituency abolished
