= Shadow Cabinet of Bill Rowling =

New Zealand shadow cabinet (1975–1983)

New Zealand political leader Bill Rowling assembled a shadow cabinet system amongst the Labour caucus following his position change to Leader of the Opposition in 1975. He composed this of individuals who acted for the party as spokespeople in assigned roles while he was leader (1975–83).

As the Labour Party formed the largest party not in government, the frontbench team was as a result the Official Opposition of the New Zealand House of Representatives.

== List of shadow ministers ==
Portfolio	Minister	Start	End
Leader	Bill Rowling	12 December 1975	3 February 1983
Deputy Leader	Bob Tizard	12 December 1975	1 November 1979
Deputy Leader	David Lange	1 November 1979	3 February 1983
Agriculture	Colin Moyle	12 December 1975	24 December 1976
Agriculture	Bruce Barclay	26 February 1977	23 March 1979
Agriculture	Basil Arthur	23 March 1979	3 February 1983
Attorney-General	Martyn Finlay	12 December 1975	7 December 1978
Attorney-General	Richard Prebble	7 December 1978	14 December 1979
Attorney-General	David Lange	14 December 1979	13 March 1981
Attorney-General	Frank O'Flynn	13 March 1981	3 February 1983
Defence	Bill Fraser	12 December 1975	26 February 1977
Defence	Roger Drayton	26 February 1977	7 December 1978
Defence	Mick Connelly	7 December 1978	14 December 1979
Defence	Arthur Faulkner	14 December 1979	13 March 1981
Defence	Mick Connelly	13 March 1981	3 February 1983
Education	Russell Marshall	12 December 1975	3 February 1983
Finance	Bob Tizard	12 December 1975	14 December 1979
Finance	Bill Rowling	14 December 1979	19 February 1982
Finance	Bob Tizard	19 February 1982	3 February 1983
Foreign Affairs	Bill Rowling	12 December 1975	26 February 1977
Foreign Affairs	Warren Freer	26 February 1977	7 December 1978
Foreign Affairs	Mick Connelly	7 December 1978	23 March 1979
Foreign Affairs	Bill Rowling	23 March 1979	14 December 1979
Foreign Affairs	Arthur Faulkner	14 December 1979	13 March 1981
Foreign Affairs	David Lange	13 March 1981	3 February 1983
Health	Jonathan Hunt	12 December 1975	14 December 1979
Health	Frank O'Flynn	14 December 1979	13 March 1981
Health	Michael Bassett	13 March 1981	19 February 1982
Health	Ann Hercus	19 February 1982	3 February 1983
Housing	Roger Douglas	12 December 1975	26 February 1977
Housing	Bill Fraser	26 February 1977	14 December 1979
Housing	Fraser Colman	14 December 1979	18 July 1980
Housing	Mike Moore	18 July 1980	3 February 1983
Justice	Martyn Finlay	12 December 1975	7 December 1978
Justice	Richard Prebble	7 December 1978	14 December 1979
Justice	David Lange	14 December 1979	13 March 1981
Justice	Frank O'Flynn	13 March 1981	3 February 1983
Labour	Arthur Faulkner	12 December 1975	14 December 1979
Labour	Kerry Burke	14 December 1979	13 March 1981
Labour	Eddie Isbey	13 March 1981	19 February 1982
Labour	Fred Gerbic	19 February 1982	3 February 1983
Maori Affairs	Matiu Rata	12 December 1975	7 December 1978
Maori Affairs	Bill Rowling	7 December 1978	14 December 1979
Maori Affairs	Koro Wetere	14 December 1979	3 February 1983
Social Welfare	Mick Connelly	12 December 1975	7 December 1978
Social Welfare	David Lange	7 December 1978	14 December 1979
Social Welfare	Whetu Tirikatene-Sullivan	14 December 1979	13 March 1981
Social Welfare	Richard Prebble	13 March 1981	19 February 1982
Social Welfare	Geoffrey Palmer	19 February 1982	3 February 1983
Trade and Industry	Warren Freer	12 December 1975	7 December 1978
Trade and Industry	Joe Walding	7 December 1978	8 May 1981
Trade and Industry	Roger Douglas	8 May 1981	3 February 1983
Transport	Basil Arthur	12 December 1975	23 March 1979
Transport	Ron Bailey	23 March 1979	14 December 1979
Transport	Roger Douglas	14 December 1979	30 June 1980
Transport	Fraser Colman	18 July 1980	19 February 1982
Transport	Richard Prebble	19 February 1982	3 February 1983
Works and Development	Ron Bailey	12 December 1975	23 March 1979
Works and Development	Mick Connelly	23 March 1979	19 February 1982
Works and Development	Fraser Colman	19 February 1982	3 February 1983

== Frontbench teams ==
=== January 1976 ===
Rowling announced his first shadow cabinet in January 1976. It contained many changes following the defeat of many senior MPs in the 1975 general election and the death of Stan Whitehead.

Rank	Shadow Minister	Portfolio/s
1	Rt Hon Bill Rowling	Leader of the Opposition; Shadow Minister of Foreign Affairs; Shadow Minister of Overseas Trade
2	Hon Bob Tizard	Deputy Leader of the Opposition; Shadow Minister of Finance; Shadow Minister of Revenue
3	Hon Warren Freer	Shadow Minister of Trade and Industry
4	Hon Martyn Finlay	Shadow Minister of Justice; Shadow Attorney-General
5	Hon Mick Connelly	Shadow Minister for Social Welfare
6	Hon Arthur Faulkner	Shadow Minister of Labour; Shadow Minister of Employment
7	Hon Colin Moyle	Shadow Minister of Agriculture; Shadow Minister of Science & Technology
8	Hon Bill Fraser	Shadow Minister of Defence
9	Hon Sir Basil Arthur	Shadow Minister of Transport; Shadow Minister of Communications
10	Hon Matiu Rata	Shadow Minister of Maori Affairs
11	Hon Whetu Tirikatene-Sullivan	Shadow Minister of Tourism; Shadow Minister for Family Affairs
12	Hon Fraser Colman	Shadow Minister of Immigration
13	Hon Roger Douglas	Shadow Minister of Housing
14	Hon Ron Bailey	Shadow Minister of Works and Development
15	Russell Marshall	Shadow Minister of Education
16	Bruce Barclay	Shadow Minister of Lands
17	Eddie Isbey	Shadow Minister for Sport & Recreation; Shadow Minister for the Arts
18	Brian MacDonell	Shadow Minister of Customs
19	Jonathan Hunt	Shadow Minister of Health
20	Koro Wetere	Shadow Minister of Forests
21	Roger Drayton	Shadow Minister of State Services; Senior Whip
22	Trevor Young	Shadow Minister of Energy; Junior Whip
23	Gerald O'Brien	Shadow Minister of Local Government
24	Paddy Blanchfield	Shadow Minister of Fisheries
25	Gordon Christie	Shadow Minister of Police
26	Paraone Reweti	Shadow Minister of Marine
27	Dr Gerry Wall	Shadow Minister of Broadcasting
28	Mary Batchelor	Shadow Minister of Women's Affairs
29	John Kirk	Shadow Postmaster-General
30	Richard Prebble	Shadow Minister for the Environment
31	Frank Rogers	Shadow Minister of Statistics

=== February 1977 ===
Rowling reallocated the portfolios of his shadow cabinet in February 1977 following the resignation of Colin Moyle who left parliament after controversial allegations made the previous year. Gerald O'Brien was relieved of all portfolios also following controversial allegations and recorded as being "on leave".

Rank	Shadow Minister	Portfolio/s
1	Rt Hon Bill Rowling	Leader of the Opposition; Shadow Minister of Broadcasting
2	Hon Bob Tizard	Deputy Leader of the Opposition; Shadow Minister of Finance; Shadow Minister of Revenue
3	Hon Warren Freer	Shadow Minister of Foreign Affairs; Shadow Minister of Overseas Trade; Shadow Minister of Trade and Industry
4	Hon Martyn Finlay	Shadow Minister of Justice; Shadow Attorney-General
5	Hon Mick Connelly	Shadow Minister for Social Welfare
6	Hon Arthur Faulkner	Shadow Minister of Labour
7	Hon Bill Fraser	Shadow Minister of Housing
8	Hon Sir Basil Arthur	Shadow Minister of Transport
9	Hon Matiu Rata	Shadow Minister of Maori Affairs
10	Hon Whetu Tirikatene-Sullivan	Shadow Minister for Family Affairs
11	Hon Fraser Colman	Shadow Minister of Energy
12	Hon Roger Douglas	Shadow Minister for Consumer Affairs
13	Hon Ron Bailey	Shadow Minister of Works and Development
14	Russell Marshall	Shadow Minister of Education
15	Bruce Barclay	Shadow Minister of Agriculture
16	Eddie Isbey	Shadow Minister for Sport & Recreation; Shadow Minister for the Arts
17	Brian MacDonell	Shadow Minister of Customs; Shadow Minister for Regional Development
18	Jonathan Hunt	Shadow Minister of Health
19	Koro Wetere	Shadow Minister of Lands; Shadow Minister of Forests
20	Roger Drayton	Shadow Minister of Defence; Senior Whip
21	Trevor Young	Shadow Minister of Immigration; Junior Whip
22	Paddy Blanchfield	Shadow Minister of Mines
23	Gordon Christie	Shadow Minister of Police
24	Paraone Reweti	Shadow Minister of Marine
25	Dr Gerry Wall	Shadow Minister of Local Government; Shadow Minister for Race Relations
26	Mary Batchelor	Shadow Minister of Women's Affairs
27	John Kirk	Shadow Minister of Tourism
28	Richard Prebble	Shadow Minister for the Environment
29	Frank Rogers	Shadow Postmaster-General
30	Mel Courtney	Shadow Minister of Fisheries; Shadow Minister of Horticulture

=== December 1978 ===
Rowling reshuffled his shadow cabinet in December 1978 following Labour's defeat in the 1978 general election. He reduced the number of spokespersons from 31 to a more manageable 17. It was also notable for the omission of Matiu Rata as Shadow Minister of Maori Affairs, Rowling did not initially allocate the Maori Affairs portfolio to anyone else however.

Rowling announced changes in March 1979 owing to the ongoing illness of Bruce Barclay. Sir Basil Arthur was to act as agriculture spokesman and his shadow transport portfolio was given to Ron Bailey. Bailey's shadow works and development portfolio was given to Mick Connelly, who retained defence and police but the shadow foreign affairs role was transferred to Rowling. At the same time Mary Batchelor became spokesperson for women and family affairs.

There was a minor reshuffle in October 1979. David Caygill was given charge of economic development to ease the workload of Bob Tizard, John Terris was given broadcasting from Ron Bailey and Arthur Faulkner (who at the time was in ill-health) was relieved of electoral reform and accident compensation to Ralph Maxwell and David Butcher respectively. Rowling made the decision to give the responsibilities to first-term MPs to "show off their abilities".

Rank	Shadow Minister	Portfolio/s
1	Rt Hon Bill Rowling	Leader of the Opposition; Shadow Minister of Overseas Trade
2	Hon Bob Tizard	Deputy Leader of the Opposition; Shadow Minister of Finance; Shadow Minister of Revenue
3	Hon Joe Walding	Shadow Minister of Trade and Industry
4	Hon Sir Basil Arthur	Shadow Minister of Transport; Shadow Minister of Communications
5	Hon Mick Connelly	Shadow Minister of Foreign Affairs; Shadow Minister of Defence; Shadow Minister of Police
6	Hon Fraser Colman	Shadow Minister of Energy; Shadow Minister for the Environment
7	Russell Marshall	Shadow Minister of Education
8	Hon Roger Douglas	Shadow Minister of Consumer Affairs
9	Hon Arthur Faulkner	Shadow Minister of Labour; Shadow Minister of Employment
10	Hon Warren Freer	Shadow Minister of Regional Development; Shadow Minister of Tourism
11	Hon Bill Fraser	Shadow Minister of Housing
12	Hon Ron Bailey	Shadow Minister of Works and Development
13	Bruce Barclay	Shadow Minister of Agriculture; Shadow Minister of Lands; Shadow Minister of Forestry; Shadow Minister of Fisheries
14	Hon Whetu Tirikatene-Sullivan	Shadow Minister for Family Affairs
15	Jonathan Hunt	Shadow Minister of Health
16	Richard Prebble	Shadow Minister of Justice; Shadow Attorney-General
17	David Lange	Shadow Minister for Social Welfare
18	Eddie Isbey	Shadow Minister of Local Government
	Mary Batchelor	Shadow Minister of Women's Affairs
	David Caygill	Shadow Minister of Economic Development
	John Terris	Shadow Minister of Broadcasting
	David Butcher	Shadow Minister for Accident Compensation
	Ralph Maxwell	Shadow Minister for Electoral Reform

=== December 1979 ===
Rowling instituted a new system in December 1979 where the shadow cabinet was separated from the party caucus. The shadow cabinet was limited to 15 members, the leader and deputy leader were granted automatic entry with an election held for the remaining 13 positions. The remaining MPs were allocated portfolios in a wider group.

Roger Douglas was sacked from the shadow cabinet on 30 June 1980 for releasing an "Alternative Budget" against Rowling's wishes which caused a minor reshuffle. Douglas' portfolios were given to Fraser Colman, while Colman's Housing portfolio was given to Mike Moore.

Rank	Shadow Minister	Portfolio/s
1	Rt Hon Bill Rowling	Leader of the Opposition; Shadow Minister of Finance
2	David Lange	Deputy Leader of the Opposition; Shadow Attorney-General; Shadow Minister of Justice; Shadow Minister of Pacific Island Affairs
3	Hon Bob Tizard	Shadow Minister of Economic Development; Shadow Minister of Energy
4	Hon Sir Basil Arthur	Shadow Minister of Agriculture; Shadow Minister of Fisheries
5	Hon Mick Connelly	Shadow Minister of Works and Development; Shadow Minister of Police
6	Hon Fraser Colman	Shadow Minister of Housing
7	Russell Marshall	Shadow Minister of Education; Senior Whip
8	Hon Roger Douglas	Shadow Minister of Transport; Shadow Minister of Communications
9	Hon Joe Walding	Shadow Minister of Trade and Industry; Shadow Minister of Overseas Trade
10	Hon Arthur Faulkner	Shadow Minister of Foreign Affairs; Shadow Minister of Defence
11	Hon Whetu Tirikatene-Sullivan	Shadow Minister of Social Welfare; Shadow Minister for Family Affairs
12	Koro Wetere	Shadow Minister of Maori Affairs; Shadow Minister of Lands
13	Frank O'Flynn	Shadow Minister of Health
14	Kerry Burke	Shadow Minister of Labour; Shadow Minister of State Services
15	Dr Michael Bassett	Shadow Minister of Internal Affairs; Shadow Minister of Local Government; Shadow Minister of Sport & Recreation
16	David Caygill	Associate Shadow Minister of Economic Development
17	Stan Rodger	Associate Shadow Minister of Transport; Associate Shadow Minister of Communications
18	Mike Moore	Associate Shadow Minister for Social Welfare; Associate Shadow Minister of Health; Associate Shadow Minister of Education
19	Eddie Isbey	Shadow Minister for Industrial Relations; Associate Shadow Minister of Labour
20	Ann Hercus	Shadow Minister of Production and Marketing
21	John Terris	Shadow Minister of Broadcasting
22	David Butcher	Shadow Minister for ACC; Shadow Minister for Youth
23	Ralph Maxwell	Shadow Minister for the Electoral Department
	Mary Batchelor	Shadow Minister of Women's Affairs
	Mel Courtney	Shadow Minister of Horticulture
	Jonathan Hunt	Shadow Minister for Constitutional Affairs; Shadow Minister for Parliamentary Reform
	John Kirk	Shadow Minister of Railways
	Brian MacDonell	Shadow Minister of Consumer Affairs
	Paraone Reweti	Shadow Minister of Marine
	Jack Ridley	Shadow Minister of Employment; Shadow Minister of Technology
	Frank Rogers	Shadow Postmaster-General
	Dr Gerry Wall	Shadow Minister for Race Relations
	Trevor Young	Shadow Minister of Tourism

=== March 1981 ===
Rowling reshuffled his shadow cabinet in March 1981 in preparation for the general election scheduled for the end of the year. He did not reinstate Douglas to the shadow cabinet. However, after Joe Walding unexpectedly announced his intention to retire, Rowling did reinstate Douglas to the shadow cabinet as his replacement in the Trade and Industry portfolio.

Rank	Shadow Minister	Portfolio/s
1	Rt Hon Bill Rowling	Leader of the Opposition; Shadow Minister of Finance
2	David Lange	Deputy Leader of the Opposition; Shadow Minister of Foreign Affairs
3	Hon Bob Tizard	Shadow Minister of Economic Development; Shadow Minister of Energy
4	Hon Sir Basil Arthur	Shadow Minister of Agriculture; Shadow Minister of Primary Industries
5	Hon Mick Connelly	Shadow Minister of Works and Development; Shadow Minister of Defence; Shadow Minister of Police
6	Russell Marshall	Shadow Minister of Education
7	Hon Joe Walding	Shadow Minister of Trade and Industry; Shadow Minister of Overseas Trade
8	Koro Wetere	Shadow Minister of Maori Affairs; Shadow Minister of Lands
9	Frank O'Flynn	Shadow Minister of Justice; Shadow Attorney-General
10	Kerry Burke	Shadow Minister of Employment; Shadow Minister of Science & Technology
11	Mike Moore	Shadow Minister of Housing; Shadow Minister for the Environment
12	Dr Michael Bassett	Shadow Minister for Health
13	Richard Prebble	Shadow Minister for Social Welfare; Shadow Minister of Pacific Island Affairs
14	David Caygill	Shadow Minister of Local Government
15	Ann Hercus	Shadow Minister of Consumer Affairs; Shadow Minister of Stabilization
16	Geoffrey Palmer	Shadow Minister of Constitutional Affairs; Associate Shadow Minister of Justice
17	Eddie Isbey	Shadow Minister of Labour; Shadow Minister of Immigration
18	Brian MacDonell	Shadow Minister of Customs; Shadow Postmaster-General
19	Jonathan Hunt	Senior Whip
20	Stan Rodger	Junior Whip
21	Hon Fraser Colman	Shadow Minister of Transport
22	John Terris	Shadow Minister of Internal Affairs; Shadow Minister of Broadcasting

=== February 1982 ===
Another election for the shadow cabinet was held on 4 February 1982 following Labour's narrow defeat in the 1981 general election. Two members of the previous shadow cabinet, Michael Bassett and Whetu Tirikatene-Sullivan, were voted out. Several changes were made to the membership via the caucus election results, after which Rowling reshuffled the portfolios.

Rank	Shadow Minister	Portfolio/s
1	Rt Hon Bill Rowling	Leader of the Opposition
2	David Lange	Deputy Leader of the Opposition; Shadow Minister of Foreign Affairs
3	Hon Bob Tizard	Shadow Minister of Finance
4	Hon Sir Basil Arthur	Shadow Minister of Agriculture; Shadow Minister of Fisheries; Shadow Minister of Forests
5	Russell Marshall	Shadow Minister of Education; Shadow Minister of Science and Technology; Shadow Minister for the Environment
6	Hon Fraser Colman	Shadow Minister of Works and Development; Shadow Minister of Mines
7	Koro Wetere	Shadow Minister of Maori Affairs; Shadow Minister of Lands
8	Hon Roger Douglas	Shadow Minister of Trade and Industry
9	Hon Mick Connelly	Shadow Minister of Defence; Shadow Minister of Police
10	Frank O'Flynn	Shadow Minister of Justice; Shadow Attorney-General
11	Hon Colin Moyle	Shadow Minister of Overseas Trade; Shadow Minister of Rural Banking
12	Kerry Burke	Shadow Minister of Employment; Shadow Minister of Regional Development; Shadow Minister of Tourism
13	Richard Prebble	Shadow Minister of Transport; Shadow Minister of Railways; Shadow Minister of Pacific Island Affairs; Shadow Minister of Civil Aviation
14	David Caygill	Shadow Minister of Energy
15	Ann Hercus	Shadow Minister of Health; Shadow Minister of Consumer Affairs
16	Geoffrey Palmer	Shadow Minister of Social Welfare; Shadow Minister for ACC; Shadow Minister of Constitutional Affairs
17	Mike Moore	Shadow Minister of Housing; Shadow Minister of Customs
18	Eddie Isbey	Shadow Minister of Internal Affairs; Shadow Minister of Local Government; Shadow Minister of Civil Defence; Shadow Minister of Sport and Recreation
19	Fred Gerbic	Shadow Minister for Labour; Shadow Minister of State Services
20	Jonathan Hunt	Senior Whip; Shadow Minister of Broadcasting
21	Stan Rodger	Junior Whip; Shadow Postmaster-General
