= Barrett Crumen =

New Zealand seaman and itinerant rural labourer

- Statue of Crumen in Masterton
- Born: 26 March 1878; Latvia, Russian Empire
- Died: 19 September 1968 (aged 90); New Zealand
- Other name: Russian Jack
- Occupations: Seaman, swagger

Barrett Crumen (also Krumen; 26 March 1878 – 19 September 1968), popularly known as Russian Jack, was a New Zealand seaman and itinerant rural labourer (swagger). He became known as one of the last surviving representatives of New Zealand's traditional swagger culture in the first half of the 20th century.

== Early life ==
According to the Dictionary of New Zealand Biography, Crumen was born on 26 March 1878 in present-day Latvia, then part of the Russian Empire. He came from a Lutheran family. Little is known about his parents or early childhood. He reportedly attended school for about three years before beginning work in forestry.

At about the age of 24 he went to sea and is believed to have worked in the merchant marine for approximately a decade.

== Arrival in New Zealand ==
In 1912 Crumen arrived in New Zealand aboard the British steamship Star of Canada. On 23 June 1912, the vessel was wrecked near Gisborne during a severe storm. Crumen later recalled narrowly escaping death while attempting to free the ship's anchor.

Following the shipwreck, he initially planned to walk to Wellington to sign on with another vessel, but instead decided to remain in New Zealand permanently.

=== "Russian Jack" ===
For the next 53 years Crumen travelled mainly on foot across the North Island, particularly in the regions of Manawatū-Whanganui and Wairarapa. Carrying bags filled with clothing, blankets, and provisions, he worked seasonally on farms and rural properties in exchange for food and accommodation.

Although Latvian by birth, local residents commonly referred to him as Russian Jack, reflecting the common English-language practice of identifying people from the Russian Empire simply as "Russians". Biographers have also suggested that the surname Crumen may not have been his original family name, possibly deriving from the word crewman.

Contemporaries remembered him for his honesty, independence, and distinctive lifestyle, and he became a familiar figure in rural communities throughout the North Island.

== Later years and death ==
By the mid-20th century Crumen was regarded as one of the last surviving representatives of New Zealand's disappearing swagger culture. Journalists, photographers, and local historians frequently documented him as a "living symbol" of old rural New Zealand.

He died in New Zealand on 19 September 1968 at the age of 90.

== Legacy ==
Crumen's story has been cited in works on New Zealand rural life, labour history, and migration. The figure of "Russian Jack" became part of regional folklore and historical memory associated with New Zealand's itinerant workers.

=== Monument ===
In 1999 a bronze statue of Crumen, known locally as Russian Jack, was unveiled in Masterton, New Zealand. The sculpture, created by New Zealand sculptor Ken Kendall, was installed in Masterton Library Square. The commemorative plaque reads:

Russian Jack
Barrett Crumen
1878–1968
Last of the Swaggers

== In popular culture ==
Crumen's nickname and image have also been preserved in contemporary New Zealand commercial culture. The wine brand Russian Jack, produced in the Marlborough region, was named in his honour and refers to his story in its branding.
