= Philip Burdon =

New Zealand politician (born 1939)

The Honourable Philip Burdon
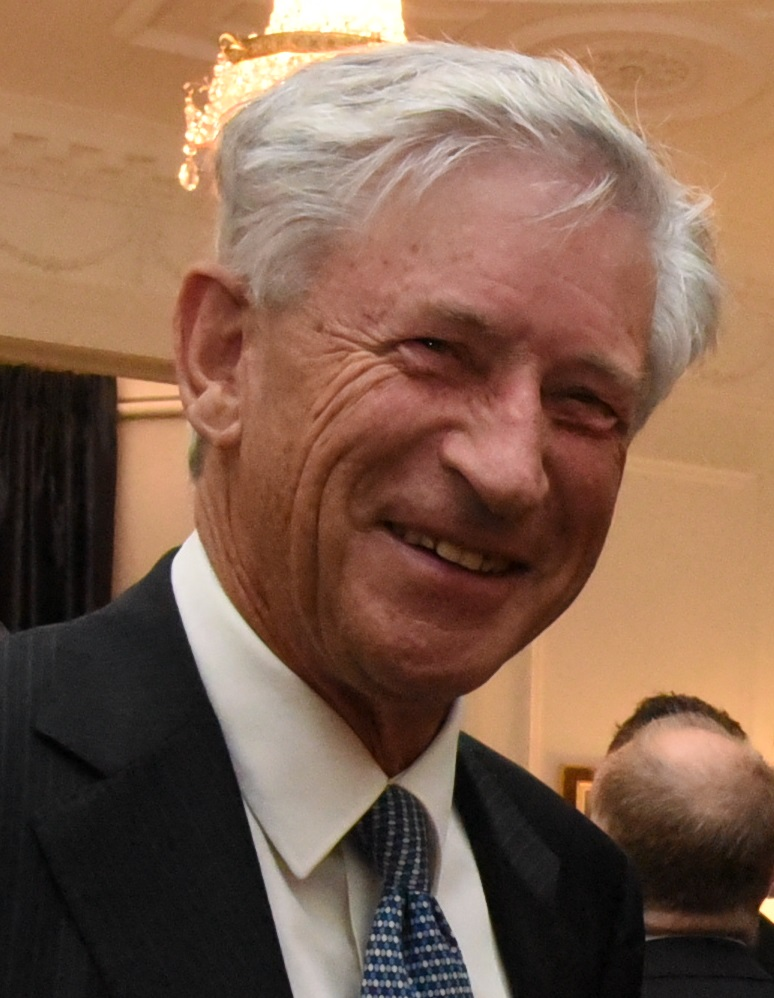
- Burdon in 2017

Member of the New Zealand Parliament for Fendalton
- In office 28 November 1981 – 12 October 1996
- Preceded by: Eric Holland
- Succeeded by: Constituency abolished

Personal details
- Born: Philip Ralph Burdon; 25 March 1939 (age 87) Geraldine, New Zealand
- Party: National
- Spouse: Rosalind Alice Waley-Cohen (m. 1966)
- Relations: Bernard Waley-Cohen (father-in-law); Randal Burdon (uncle)
- Children: 3

Philip Ralph Burdon (born 25 March 1939) is a former New Zealand politician and lawyer by profession. He was the co-founder of Meadow Mushrooms.

== Early life and family ==
Burdon was born in Geraldine on 25 March 1939, the son of Cotsford Carlton Burdon and Ruth Mildred Burdon (née Barker). He was educated at Christ's College in Christchurch from 1953 to 1956, and studied law at the University of Canterbury, graduating LLB.

On 8 December 1966 in London, Burdon married Rosalind Alice Waley-Cohen, the daughter of the late Sir Bernard Waley-Cohen, former Lord Mayor of London, and the couple went on to have three children. In the 2002 Queen's Birthday and Golden Jubilee Honours, Rosalind Burdon was appointed a Companion of the New Zealand Order of Merit, for services to the arts and the community.

Philip Burdon worked as a legal advisor for Mobil Oil in Wellington in 1967. In 1969, he and Roger Giles began a company growing mushrooms in caves on the Mediterranean island of Cyprus, but following the Turkish invasion of Cyprus in 1974, they concentrated all their efforts on their New Zealand company, Meadow Mushrooms, established at Prebbleton in 1970. From 1977 to 1978, Burdon was a visiting lecturer in law at Lincoln College.

== Member of Parliament ==
New Zealand Parliament
Years	Term	Electorate	Party
1981–1984	40th	Fendalton	National
1984–1987	41st	Fendalton	National
1987–1990	42nd	Fendalton	National
1990–1993	43rd	Fendalton	National
1993–1996	44th	Fendalton	National

Burdon was an MP from 1981 to 1996, representing the National Party. He was first elected to Parliament in the 1981 elections as MP for the Christchurch electorate of Fendalton, and was re-elected for that electorate until leaving Parliament at the 1996 elections.

While in Opposition, Burdon was the National Party spokesman for health from 1985 to 1986, and trade and industry between 1986 and 1990.

Burdon was the New Zealand Minister of State Owned Enterprises from 1993 to 1996. Other ministerial positions that he held were Minister for Trade Negotiations, Minister of Commerce, Minister for Industry, and Associate Minister of External Relations and Trade.

In 1990, Burdon was awarded the New Zealand 1990 Commemoration Medal.

== Post-political career ==
As of 2009, Philip Burdon is chairman of the Asia New Zealand Foundation and patron of the New Zealand China Friendship Society.

Burdon and fellow former MP Jim Anderton were prominent campaigners for the restoration of ChristChurch Cathedral, which had been severely damaged in the February and June 2011 Christchurch earthquakes. They were ultimately successful in September 2017 when the Anglican synod made a binding decision to restore the church.

In 2016, Burdon was inducted into the New Zealand Business Hall of Fame.

New Zealand Parliament
Preceded by Eric Holland	Member of Parliament for Fendalton; 1981–1996	Constituency abolished
