= David Penfold =

New Zealand field hockey player

David Frederick Penfold (born 23 October 1964) is a former field hockey player from New Zealand, who finished in eighth position with the Men's National Team, nicknamed Black Sticks, at the 1992 Summer Olympics in Barcelona, Spain. He was born in Christchurch.

He attended Burnside High School, Christchurch from 1978 to 1982.
