= Fred Beyeler =

New Zealand cricketer (born 1965)

Fred Beyeler (born 5 November 1965 in Wellington) is a former New Zealand cricketer. Beyeler attended Rongotai College from 1979 to 1983 and played 18 first-class matches for the Wellington Firebirds in the late 1980s.
