= Beatrice Barth =

New Zealand piano teacher (1877–1966)

Beatrice Mary Barth (11 May 1877 – 14 January 1966) was a New Zealand piano teacher. She was born in London, England.

She was the second president of the Society of Women Musicians of Otago, which was noted as an important support group for professional women music teachers, as well as their pupils.
