= Disappearance of Kirsa Jensen =

1983 missing child case in New Zealand

Kirsa Jensen
- Born: 15 December 1968; New Zealand
- Disappeared: 1 September 1983 (aged 14); Napier, New Zealand
- Status: Missing for 43 years, 2 months and 17 days

Kirsa Jensen (born 15 December 1968) was a 14-year-old girl who lived in Napier, New Zealand when she disappeared on 1 September 1983 while riding her horse, Commodore. She never returned home that night and has not been seen since. Her horse was found wandering near the Tūtaekurī River but few traces of Jensen were ever discovered, and the case remains unsolved. Police believed that Jensen was abducted and murdered. The case is one of few unsolved New Zealand murder mysteries and is significant within a New Zealand context.

== Disappearance ==
At around 3:00pm on 1 September 1983, Kirsa collected her horse for an afternoon ride to a local beach. The last confirmed sighting was of Kirsa, with a bloodied face, and her horse near an old World War Two gun emplacement at the mouth of the Tūtaekurī River. She was also seen speaking to a man in a white utility vehicle around the same time.

=== The search ===
When Kirsa failed to return home by 5:30pm, her family began to search for her, and alerted the police shortly afterwards. Though her horse was located, continued searches by police and volunteers over the following days, including through the local river and other waterways, failed to turn up any signs of the missing girl.

On 6 September, a $5000 reward was offered by a Napier newspaper for any information leading to the recovery of Kirsa. Various psychics and mediums sought to assist police but these were later described by the investigating officer as unhelpful.

=== The man in the white utility vehicle ===
One of the most important pieces of information received was from a passer-by who noticed a girl fitting Kirsa's description by the gun emplacement, being held at arm's length by a European man, who was approximately 1.8 metres tall and 45–50 years in age.

The same witness also noted a white utility vehicle with brown sides which was parked close by. Another witness stopped and talked to Kirsa at the gun emplacement, who noticed her bloodied face, which she told him had occurred when she fell from her horse. Kirsa advised the witness that someone had gone to collect her parents and that she expected them to arrive shortly.

Another witness advised police that at approximately 4:30pm he had driven past a white utility vehicle coming off the bridge. The driver was described as a brown-haired white male, approximately 20–30 years old. His arm was around the girl passenger's shoulders and he was driving using one hand. Kirsa's horse Commodore was seen by several witnesses after this, tied to the gun emplacement.

=== Case still open ===
The primary suspect was John Russell, who already had a conviction for rape. He identified himself to police as the man who was seen with Jensen at the gun emplacement. The police investigated his house and truck, but no evidence was found that Kirsa had been there. In 1985, Russell confessed to murdering Jensen but later retracted the confession. No charges were laid.

In 1992, Russell committed suicide in a Hastings guest house after going to Lake Alice Hospital psychiatric facility for help with a medical condition. He left no note explaining why he killed himself. The case remains open and in 2009 the officer in charge said that there was probably more evidence to suggest Russell was not involved than that he was.

In 1999 in Melbourne, an Australian man confessed to police that he had killed Jensen, but this also proved unfounded.

In 2012 workmen discovered human bones in the area and initially thought they were Jensen's. Examination found that they were too old.

=== Advances in forensic science ===
Ongoing advances in forensic science have added to the potential for solving the Jensen case according to media reports. They have included pollen sampling and new DNA detection techniques.

Stuart Nash MP cited the case as one of his reasons for supporting the Criminal Investigations (Bodily Samples) Amendment Bill in the New Zealand Parliament.

== Legacy ==
=== Victim support ===
In 2009, Jensen's mother Robyn Jensen was working as a school guidance counsellor and had a private practice. She said she wanted to provide a place where parents of murdered children can connect with others who have suffered such trauma, talk, ask questions, and have therapy and group work. In 2003, Robyn undertook a pioneering study for her master's degree called The grief experiences of parents who have lost a child through violent crime which explored this area of victim support.

=== Memorials ===
A memorial plaque was erected and a pohutukawa tree planted at the site of Jensen's disappearance by the local community. In 2006 the tree was damaged by vandals. Saint Augustine's Church in Napier, where Jensen's father was minister at the time of her disappearance, had a side chapel dedicated to her. The side chapel was removed when the church was demolished in 2021.

=== Trust fund scholarship ===
The trust fund set up initially to aid the search asked Massey University to administer a portion of the funds for an award for students entering the third, fourth or fifth year of a Bachelor of Veterinary Science degree. The award takes into account need as well as academic attainment. Jensen had intended to study veterinary science. There is also a Cup.

=== The arts ===
The legacy of Jensen's disappearance has also found its way into the arts, with a movie reviewer of 2003 New Zealand film For Good by Stuart MacKenzie stating that the film would bring back people's memories of the case. Jensen was also one of the names on Wilson O'Halloran's 2004 mixed media artwork Fifteen Murders of Fame.

=== Media ===
Various crime podcasts have covered the case. In November 2017, a podcast in the Radio New Zealand series The Lost featured the case. In 2023, it was also featured in Untold Stories (A Guilt Podcast) hosted by Ryan Wolf.

== See also ==
- List of people who disappeared mysteriously: post-1970
