= Te Iki-o-te-rangi Pouwhare =

Te Iki-o-te-rangi Pouwhare (1880–1963) was a New Zealand tribal leader, historian and genealogist. Of Māori descent, he identified with the Tuhoe iwi. He was born in Te Houhi, Wanganui, New Zealand in about 1880.
