= List of United States presidential visits to Australia and New Zealand =

Several United States presidents have made presidential visits to Australia and New Zealand. The first visit by an incumbent to these Australasian nations was made in 1966 by Lyndon B. Johnson. His three-day five-city visit to Australia was intended as a show of gratitude to the Australian nation for its then emphatic support for the Vietnam War. Four presidents have traveled there since. Prior to arriving in Australia, Johnson visited New Zealand. He went primarily to shore up support for the war in Vietnam. Only one sitting president has visited since.

== Australia ==
President	Dates	Locations	Notes
Lyndon B. Johnson	October 20–23, 1966	Canberra, Melbourne, Sydney, Brisbane, Townsville	State visit. Met with Governor-General Richard Casey and Prime Minister Harold Holt.
Lyndon B. Johnson	December 21–23, 1967	Canberra, Melbourne, Sydney	Attended the funeral of Prime Minister Holt and conferred with other attending dignitaries and heads of state.
George H. W. Bush	December 31, 1991 – January 3, 1992	Sydney, Canberra, Melbourne	Met with Prime Minister Paul Keating and senior Australian officials. Addressed the Australian Parliament.
Bill Clinton	November 19–23, 1996	Sydney, Canberra, Port Douglas	State Visit. Addressed Parliament and visited the Great Barrier Reef.
George W. Bush	October 22, 2003	Canberra	Met with Prime Minister John Howard and addressed Parliament.
George W. Bush	September 3–8, 2007	Sydney	Attended 19th Asia-Pacific Economic Cooperation Leaders Meeting.
Barack Obama	November 16–17, 2011	Canberra, Darwin	Met with Prime Minister Julia Gillard; announced a new military cooperation agreement.
Barack Obama	November 15–16, 2014	Brisbane, Sydney	Attended the G-20 Summit Meeting.

== New Zealand ==
President	Dates	Locations	Notes
Lyndon B. Johnson	October 19–20, 1966	Wellington	State visit. Met with Prime Minister Keith Holyoake.
Bill Clinton	September 11–15, 1999	Auckland, Queenstown, Christchurch	State visit. Met with Prime Minister Jenny Shipley. Attended 11th Asia-Pacific Economic Cooperation Leaders meeting.

== See also ==
- Australia–United States relations
- New Zealand–United States relations
- Foreign relations of Australia
- Foreign relations of New Zealand
- Foreign policy of the United States
- Foreign relations of the United States
