= Louis Daly Irving Austin =

Louis Daly Irving Austin (20 February 1877 – 7 April 1967) was a New Zealand pianist, music teacher, conductor, composer and critical gadfly. He was born in London, England.
