= Ian Woodley (field hockey) =

New Zealand field hockey player

Personal information
- Full name: Ian Douglas Woodley
- Born: 20 August 1963 (age 62) Temuka, New Zealand

Sport
- Country: New Zealand
- Sport: Field hockey

Ian Douglas Woodley (born 20 August 1963) is a former New Zealand field hockey goalkeeper. He was a member of the New Zealand men's hockey team that finished in eighth position at the 1992 Summer Olympics in Barcelona.
