= John Young (composer) =

Electroacoustic music composer from New Zealand (born 1962)

John Young is an electroacoustic music composer born on 4 March 1962 in Christchurch, New Zealand. He lives in Leicester, UK.

He studied at the University of Canterbury, completing a doctorate on the manipulation of environmental sound sources in electroacoustic music. In 1989, with the assistance of the Queen Elizabeth II Arts Council of New Zealand (now the Creative New Zealand), he travelled to the UK to further his studies of electroacoustic music composition working privately in the studios of the University of East Anglia with Denis Smalley.

He returned to New Zealand in 1990 to take up a position at Victoria University of Wellington where he became a Senior Lecturer and Director of the Electroacoustic Music Studios. In November 2000 he joined the Music, Technology and Innovation Research Centre at De Montfort University in Leicester (UK) where he became Professor of Composition.

His main interest in composition continues to be in acousmatic music, particularly forms based on the interplay between recognizable natural sound sources and computer-based studio transformations, but also combines electroacoustics with instrumental media.

He has received a number of international awards, including First Prize in the 1996 Stockholm Electronic Arts Award (Sweden) (for his work Inner), a First Prize in the 34th Bourges International Electroacoustic Music and Sonic Art Competition (France, 2007) (for Ricordiamo Forlì) and Second Prize in the 4th Concurso Internacional de Música Eletroacústica de São Paulo (CIMESP ’01, Brazil) (for Liquid Sky).

He has been a visiting composer at San Jose State University (CA, USA), Simon Fraser University (Vancouver), the Groupe de recherches musicales (GRM, Paris, France), the iM-PACT Center of the University of Missouri-Kansas City (UMKC) (MO, USA) and, with the assistance of the Swedish Institute, at EMS (Stockholm, Sweden). He has also given invited concerts and talks at many other places around the world, including well-known BEAST series in Birmingham (UK), at the Ai-maako festival (Santiago, Chile) and Sonoimágenes (Remedios de Escalada / Buenos Aires, Argentina).

== Recordings ==
- La limite du bruit (empreintes DIGITALes, IMED 0261, 2002)
- Lieu-temps (empreintes DIGITALes, IMED 0787, 2007)

== List of works ==
- Allting Runt Omkring (1998)
- Arrivederci (2005), ensemble, and electroacoustic sounds
- Inner (1995)
- Liquid Sky (1998)
- Pythagoras's Curtain (2001)
- Ricordiamo Forlì (2005)
- Sju (1999)
- Smoke and Mirrors (2008)
- Time, Motion and Memory (1997, 2001)
- Tongue (2001)
- Trace (2003)
- Virtual (1997)
