= Bruce Barclay =

New Zealand politician

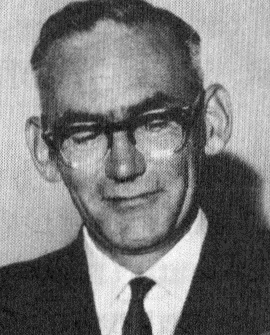
- Barclay in 1966

Member of the New Zealand Parliament for Christchurch Central
- In office 29 November 1969 – 28 June 1979
- Preceded by: Robert Macfarlane
- Succeeded by: Geoffrey Palmer

Personal details
- Born: 21 October 1922 Dargaville, New Zealand
- Died: 28 June 1979 (aged 56) New Zealand
- Party: Labour
- Spouse: Audrey Howe
- Children: 3

Bruce Gillespie Barclay (21 October 1922 – 28 June 1979) was a New Zealand politician, being the Member of Parliament for Christchurch Central in the South Island.

== Biography ==
=== Early life and career ===
Barclay was born in 1922 in Dargaville. He received his education at Whangarei High School while his father was working as a farming manager. Barclay was an active sportsman in his youth and represented South Canterbury in rugby (1942–1944) and tennis in the 1943, 1945, 1946 seasons.

From 1941 to 1951 Barclay was an agriculture instructor at the then Department of Agriculture in Timaru. Then for two years he was employed by the Valuation Department office in Timaru working between the Ashburton and Waitaki rivers. In 1953 he took up a 50 acre town milk supply farm at Halswell. In 1956 he was appointed a director of the Canterbury Dairy Farmers, Ltd. and was elected as deputy chairman of the board in 1966.

=== Political career ===
New Zealand Parliament
| Years | Term | Electorate | Party |
|---|---|---|---|
| 1969–1972 | 36th | Christchurch Central | Labour |
| 1972–1975 | 37th | Christchurch Central | Labour |
| 1975–1978 | 38th | Christchurch Central | Labour |
| 1978–1979 | 39th | Christchurch Central | Labour |

Barclay was a member of the Lyttelton Harbour Board from 1965 to 1968. He stood unsuccessfully for Labour in the Fendalton electorate in the 1963 election, the 1966 election, and the 1967 by-election. The polling night results in the Fendalton by-election showed a 67-vote majority to Barclay, however after special votes were counted National did manage to hold the seat by just 286 votes, a swing of over 5% to Labour. This was a surprise result in a safe National seat.

He represented the Christchurch Central electorate in the New Zealand House of Representatives from 1969 to 1979 when he died. Barclay was much-liked within the Labour Party. As a result of his popularity he was elected a member of the Labour Party's national council where he was active in the governance of the party. He preferentially kept a low profile in Wellington but was renown for his hard work in his electorate for constituents and was involved in many community and social groups in Christchurch. When interviewed before the 1978 election Barclay stated his main ambition as local MP was to help develop community spirit through his activity within voluntary groups. According to Auckland MP Warren Freer, Barclay would never let anyone forget that he was from and represented Christchurch.

In late 1972 after the formation of the Third Labour Government Barclay was appointed chairman of a government caucus committee to determine the details of the government's irrigation policy, wishing to increase farm production by improving farm management of water to improve soil quality. Key to this was decentralising irrigation development away from Wellington by establishing local officials committees to make decisions based on the conditions in the area.

Barclay was Parliamentary Under-Secretary to the Minister of Agriculture and from 26 March 1973 to 12 December 1975 and Under-Secretary to the Minister of Lands from 16 September 1974 to 12 December 1975. The Minister of Agriculture, Colin Moyle, delegated to Barclay the responsibility for a number of agricultural industries including pigs, poultry, beekeeping, fruit and vegetable and produce, viticulture, town milk and pasture pest control. In the pig industry Barclay was responsible for legislation to be introduced to set up an industry council for pig farming separate from the Dairy Board. He was also involved in investigating for a new and consistent supply of feedstuffs for the pig and poultry industry after seeing that both were becoming increasingly reliant on grain production which had instable and fluctuating prices. He convened a wine institute, bringing in growers and industry representatives, to define and regulate standards to improve the production quality of New Zealand made wine. His approach was to encourage and steer rather than command or push.

After Labour's shock defeat in 1975 Barclay was appointed Shadow Minister of Lands by Labour leader Bill Rowling. He was later promoted further and was additionally Shadow Minister of Agriculture, Forestry and Fisheries after Moyle resigned from parliament.

=== Death ===
Barclay had been ill for some months prior to his death where it was reported he was suffering from cancer and had already had two surgical operations. His absence was noticed at Labour's first caucus meeting in February 1979 and Rowling stated he had visited Barclay earlier and expressed concern at his health after Barclay had become unable to perform his electorate duties earlier in the month. Rowling relieved Barclay of his portfolios in March 1979 owing to his ongoing illness with Sir Basil Arthur acting as Shadow Minister of Agriculture. Barclay died on 28 June 1979 aged 56, survived by his wife and three children.

Barclay's death caused the 1979 Christchurch Central by-election that was won by Geoffrey Palmer.

== Family ==
He was the son of Jim Barclay (1882–1972), a farmer, MP for Marsden (1935-1943) and Minister of Agriculture between 1941 and 1943. A contemporary Labour MP Ron Barclay was his cousin. He played golf for recreation.

His second marriage was on 2 November 1968 to Ethel Audrey Howe, the daughter of G. Howe. They had one son and two daughters. Towards the end of his life, he lived in Tancred Street in the Christchurch suburb of Linwood. His widowed wife Audrey was elected a member of the Christchurch City Council for the Eastern Ward in 1980.

== Notes ==
New Zealand Parliament
| Preceded by Robert Macfarlane | Member of Parliament for Christchurch Central; 1969–1979 | Succeeded by Geoffrey Palmer |
Political offices
| Preceded by Colin Moyle | Shadow Minister of Agriculture; 1977–1979 | Succeeded by Sir Basil Arthur |
