= Janet Mackenzie (New Zealand teacher) =

New Zealand teacher, correspondence teacher

Janet Craig McKutcheon Mackenzie (3 July 1878 – 14 July 1962) was a New Zealand teacher and correspondence teacher. She was born in Edinburgh, Midlothian, Scotland, on 3 July 1878.
