= Mark S. Olsen =

New Zealand artist (born 1962)

Mark Olsen (born 12 October 1962 in Auckland, New Zealand) is an expressive portrait artist.

Mark Olsen paintings often contain quirky characters, with emphasis on textures and contours. Mark Olsen was a finalist in the 2004/2006 New Zealand Portrait Gallery Awards and the 2003 Wallace Art Awards and the winner of the 2007 Telecom Regional Art Awards.

His work appeared on the cover of the Auckland White Pages telephone directory in 2007. He sold four pieces of art as a result. and was a judge for the following year's Yellow Art Awards.

He was one of 60 artists featured in New Zealand's Favourite Artists in 2006.

== Children of Le Mans Car ==
In 2007 Mark Olsen created team Creation Autosportif cars on-track visual appearance for the 75th running of 24 Hours of Le Mans endurance event.
