= David Grundy =

New Zealand field hockey player (born 1963)

David John Grundy (born 24 December 1963) is a retired New Zealand field hockey player, who finished in eighth position with the New Zealand Men's National Team (nicknamed the Black Sticks) at the 1992 Summer Olympics in Barcelona. He was born in Hokitika and played 38 tests for New Zealand.
