= Paresh Patel (field hockey) =

New Zealand field hockey player

Paresh Jasmat Patel (born 29 July 1965) is a former field hockey player from New Zealand, who finished in eighth position with the Men's National Team, nicknamed Black Sticks, at the 1992 Summer Olympics in Barcelona. He was born in Auckland.
