= Ralph Talmont =

Ralph Talmont (born 1963) is an Australian/Polish author, entrepreneur, multimedia producer and communications consultant, residing in Warsaw, Poland. As a photographer and writer he has authored or co-authored over twenty books on subjects ranging from wine and yachting to world cities and crafts and his work has been published in magazines including National Geographic Traveler, GEO Saison and New Zealand Geographic. Co-founder of TEDxWarsaw and Boma Poland.

== Monographs ==
- Auckland: A Portrait (1997)
- Georgia: The Building and Travels of the World's Largest Sloop (2000)
- Legends of the Land: Living Stories of Aotearoa as Told by Ten Tribal Elders (2000)
- Tiara (2004)
- From Breadballs to Brazil (2004)
- Janice of Wyoming (2005)

== Contributions ==
- New Zealand Geographic (1995)
- The Shadowcatchers - New Zealand, The Millennium (2000)
- The Human Race (Nike) (2008)
- The Best of New Zealand Geographic (2009)
