= Anthony Thornton (field hockey) =

New Zealand field hockey player (born 1967)

Anthony Mark Thornton (born 27 March 1967) is a former field hockey player from New Zealand, who finished in eighth position with the Men's National Team, nicknamed Black Sticks, at the 1992 Summer Olympics in Barcelona. He was born in Wanganui.

He was later the head coach of the NSWIS (NSW Institute of Sport) women's hockey program.
