= Harry Lake =

New Zealand politician (1911–1967)

The Honourable Harry Lake
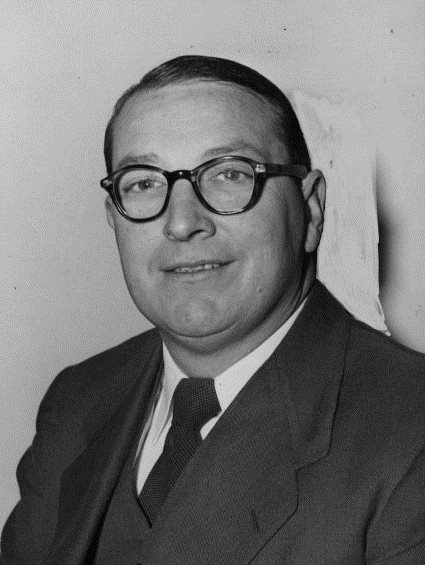

31st Minister of Finance
- In office 12 December 1960 – 21 February 1967
- Prime Minister: Keith Holyoake
- Preceded by: Arnold Nordmeyer
- Succeeded by: Robert Muldoon

Member of the New Zealand Parliament for Fendalton
- In office 26 November 1960 – 21 February 1967
- Preceded by: Jack Watts
- Succeeded by: Eric Holland

Member of the New Zealand Parliament for Lyttelton
- In office 1 September 1951 – 30 November 1957
- Preceded by: Terry McCombs
- Succeeded by: Norman Kirk

Personal details
- Born: 29 September 1911 Christchurch, New Zealand
- Died: 21 February 1967 (aged 55) Christchurch, New Zealand
- Party: National
- Spouse: Beryl Bonnington
- Children: 2
- Occupation: Accountant

Harry Robson Lake (29 September 1911 – 21 February 1967) was a New Zealand politician who served as Minister of Finance for six years in the second National government in the 1960s. He died of a heart attack when only 55 years old.

== Biography ==
=== Early life and career ===
Lake was born in Christchurch in 1911. Lake was father to two children, and grandfather to three. He attended Riccarton Primary School and Christchurch West District High School. He was further educated at the University of Canterbury, gaining a bachelor's degree in commerce. He was then employed for five years at the Vacuum Oil Company before joining a firm of public accountants, in which he later became a partner. He established an accountancy practice in 1943 and then a senior partner in the firm of Lake, Glynn and Smith. He also served a term as chairman of the Christchurch branch of the Society of Accountants.

In 1937 he married Beryl Bonnington with whom he had one son and one daughter. Lake was deemed medically unfit for active service in World War II. Instead he served within New Zealand as a duty officer in the Air Training Corps.

For several years he was an accountancy lecturer at the University of Canterbury. Lake was also a councillor of the Canterbury Manufacturers Association. He was also a member of the Christchurch Drainage Board and was chairman of its finance committee.

=== Political career ===
New Zealand Parliament
Years	Term	Electorate	Party
1951–1954	30th	Lyttelton	National
1954–1957	31st	Lyttelton	National
1960–1963	33rd	Fendalton	National
1963–1966	34th	Fendalton	National
1966–1967	35th	Fendalton	National

After holding a number of roles within the National Party's administration, he stood as the party's candidate for the Riccarton seat in the 1949 election. Riccarton was regarded as a "safe" Labour Party seat, and Lake was unsuccessful. He was the treasurer of the Canterbury-Westland division of the National Party. In the 1951 election, however, Lake won the seat of Lyttelton, which had been held by Labour for nearly forty years.

In 1953, Lake was awarded the Queen Elizabeth II Coronation Medal.

While Lake held his seat in the 1954 election, he lost it in the 1957 election to Norman Kirk (who later became Prime Minister).

In the 1960 election, which National won, Lake returned to Parliament as the MP for Fendalton (a safe National seat). He was immediately elevated to Cabinet by Prime Minister Keith Holyoake, becoming minister of finance. As Lake possessed no ministerial experience before this point, his immediate appointment to one of the most powerful ministerial posts was remarkable. Undoubtedly the reason for Lake's promotion was the fact he was a close friend and political confidante of Holyoake. In recognition of his lack of experience, however, Lake was officially ranked only sixth in Cabinet, a lower position than a minister of finance would normally expect. He was also appointed Minister of Statistics and Minister of Revenue.

Despite holding one of the most powerful political positions in the country, Lake never had a high public profile. In keeping with Holyoake's desire to maintain the status quo, Lake's tenure as minister of finance was relatively uneventful, with the primary focus being on stability. In 1964, Lake suffered his first heart attack, which reduced his energy somewhat but did not impair his ability to perform his role. In 1965 he had another heart attack, by which time he was also ailing from a kidney impairment.

At the end of 1966, New Zealand encountered economic difficulties as the result of a collapse in export prices due to the end of the wool boom. Ultimately Lake did not have a chance to respond to this problem, however.

=== Death ===
In February 1967 Lake returned to Christchurch to attend the funeral of his wife's uncle, where he suffered a second heart attack, and died. He was survived by his wife and two children.

He was succeeded as minister of finance by Robert Muldoon, and as MP for Fendalton by Eric Holland.

== Notes ==
Political offices
Preceded by Arnold Nordmeyer	Minister of Finance; 1960–1967	Succeeded by Robert Muldoon
Preceded by Walter Nash	Minister of Statistics; 1960–1967	Succeeded by Robert Muldoon
New Zealand Parliament
Preceded by Terry McCombs	Member of Parliament for Lyttelton; 1951–1957	Succeeded by Norman Kirk
Preceded by Jack Watts	Member of Parliament for Fendalton; 1960–1967	Succeeded by Eric Holland
