= Denis Rogers =

New Zealand mayor (1917–1987)

Denis Rogers OBE ED JP
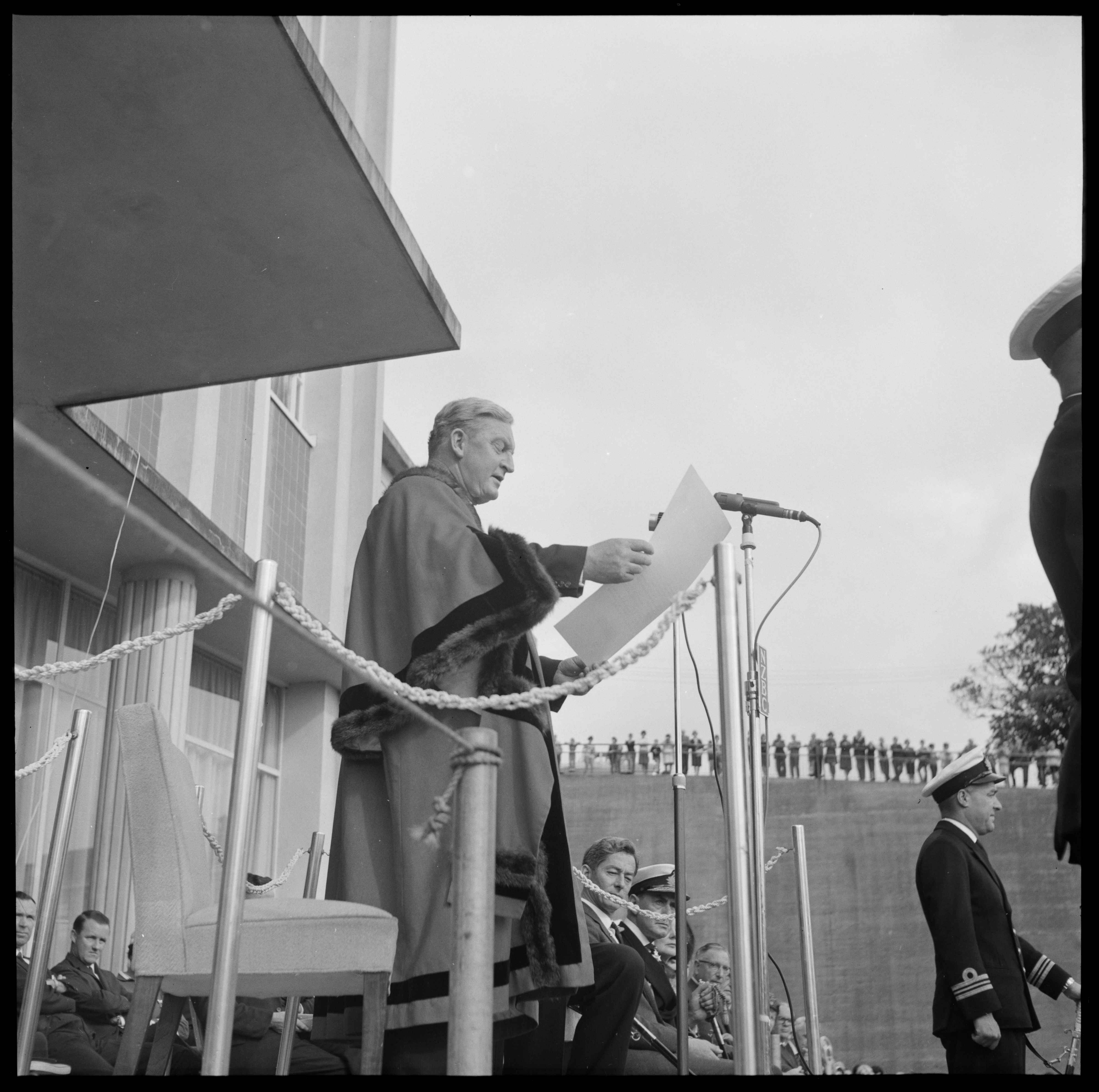
- Dennis Rogers in 1967

25th Mayor of Hamilton
- In office December 1959 – October 1968
- Preceded by: Roderick Braithwaite
- Succeeded by: Mike Minogue

Personal details
- Born: 30 September 1917
- Died: 7 December 1987 (aged 70)
- Spouse: Helen Wyn-Hesse
- Relations: Rufus Rogers (brother)

Denis Rogers OBE ED JP (30 September 1917 – 7 December 1987) was a New Zealand doctor and local-body politician.

== Biography ==
Rogers was born in Hamilton, New Zealand, and attended Nelson College from 1931 to 1934. He studied medicine at the University of Otago, graduating MB ChB in 1941, and became a general practitioner.

Rogers stood for the Hamilton City Council in 1956. He was the highest polling candidate and became deputy mayor. He was the mayor of Hamilton from 1959 to 1968, elected for three terms. During his mayoralty, he campaigned for the poor and for an international airport to be built in Hamilton.

Rogers was married to Helen Wyn-Hesse and they had three children. He was well known for his like of gardening, and the Rogers Rose Gardens in Hamilton are named after him.

In the 1964 Queen's Birthday Honours, Rogers was appointed an Officer of the Order of the British Empire, and in 1985 he was awarded the Freedom of the City of Hamilton. He died of a heart attack in 1987.

Rogers' brother, Rufus Rogers, was also a well-known political figure in Hamilton. Starting in 1956, a local campaign began to have a university in Hamilton. The barrister and solicitor Douglas Seymour chaired the lobby group for the first five years, to be succeeded by Rufus Rogers. In 1964, their work was done and the University of Waikato was officially opened by the Governor-General, Sir Bernard Fergusson. Denis Rogers was the university's first chancellor from 1964 to 1969. His brother Rufus represented the Hamilton East electorate in Parliament from 1972 to 1975.

Political offices
Preceded by Roderick Braithwaite	Mayor of Hamilton; 1959–1968	Succeeded by Mike Minogue
