= Mick Peck =

New Zealand magician

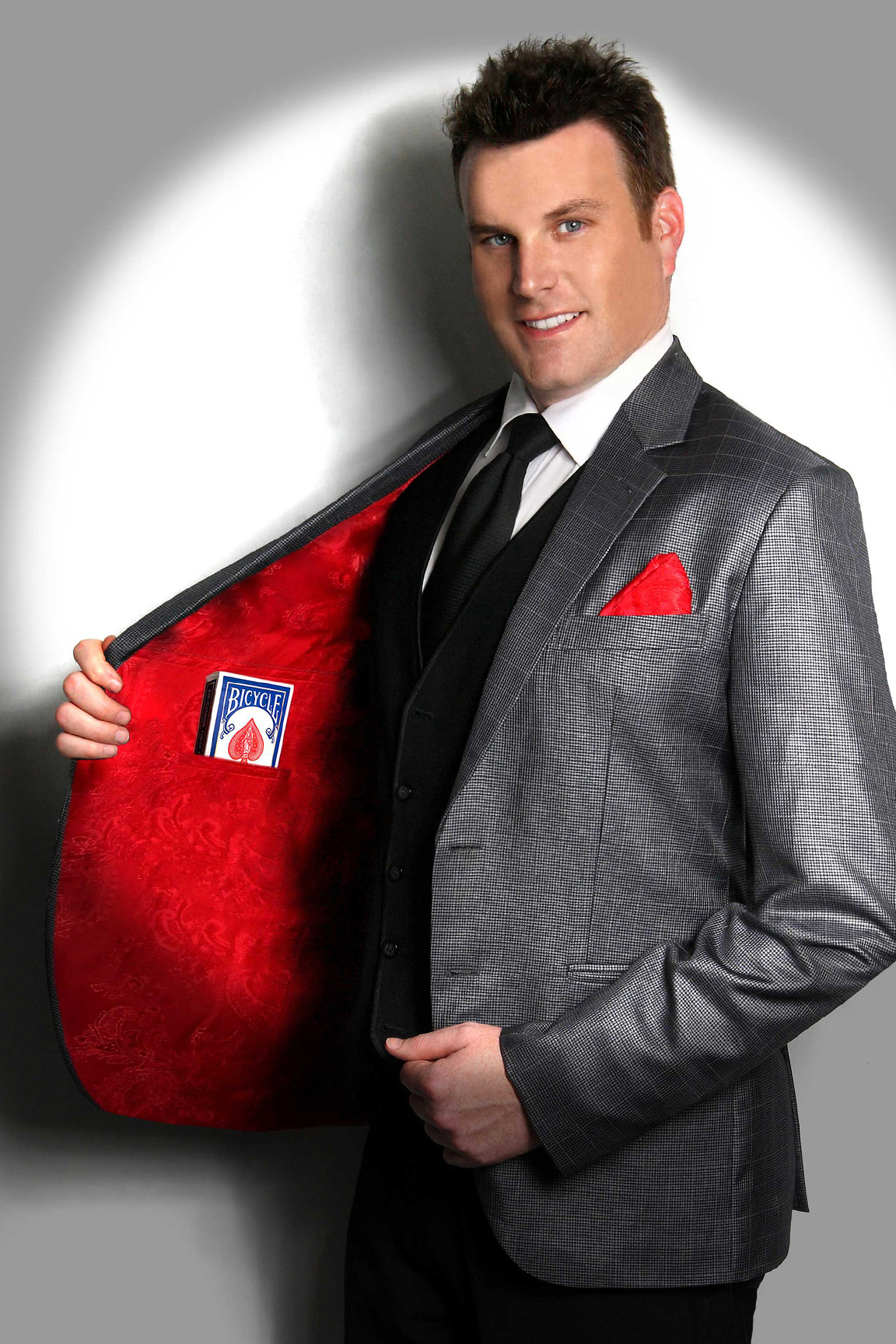
- Peck in 2016
- Born: Auckland, New Zealand
- Occupations: Magician and Entertainer
- Website: http://www.mickpeckmagic.com/

Mick Peck is a professional award-winning magician based in Auckland, New Zealand.

He is a member of The Magic Circle of London, the world's most prestigious magic organisation.

He has performed at backstage VIP parties at Spark Arena for the likes of Queen and Katy Perry.

Peck was inspired by watching magicians Paul Daniels and David Copperfield on television and presented his first magic show at the age of thirteen while at intermediate school.

He appeared on the cover of The New Zealand Herald Canvas magazine for the feature by Alan Perrott entitled "Hey Presto! - Why There's Still Room For Old-Fashioned Magic", was profiled in the Sunday Star-Times Sunday magazine for the feature "Revealing the Tricks of the Magician's Trade" by Jeremy Olds, and in Metro for the feature "Inside the Inner Circle of the Brotherhood of Auckland Magicians" by Sir Bob Harvey.

Peck is a recipient of the Auckland Chamber of Commerce Awesome Service Award, presented for providing inspirational customer service. The Awesome Service Award is supported by NewstalkZB and the Sunday Star-Times; nominations are made by customers and winners judged by Auckland Chamber of Commerce Chief Executive Michael Barnett ONZM.

He has been convention chairman for two New Zealand International Magicians Conventions (the 24th in 2004 and the 30th in 2010).

In 2012 Peck became the editor of Inside Entertainment, the monthly membership magazine of the Variety Artists Club of New Zealand, an organisation formed in 1966 for entertainers and performing artists. In 2014 he was elected vice-president of the Variety Artists Club. Peck is also the producer of the annual Amazing VAC Variety Show, held in Auckland theatres.

In 2013 he co-founded VanishLive with Paul Romhany. VanishLive is the online presence of Vanish magazine, an international trade magazine for the magic industry read by over 80,000 magicians. VanishLive features a daily roundup of global magic news, articles and reviews of magic tricks, books and DVDs.

In 2014 he was presented with a special award from Magic New Zealand "in recognition of his long term service and outstanding contribution to the magic fraternity of New Zealand".

In 2016 he was chosen as the official magician to perform at the New Zealand premiere magic-heist film Now You See Me 2.

In 2016 he was named Variety Entertainer of the Year by the Variety Artists Club of New Zealand.

In October 2018 he was presented with a Presidential Citation from the Brotherhood of Auckland Magicians Inc in recognition of his work with the annual Magic Moments Family Comedy Magic Show, which acts as a fundraiser to non-profit organisations.

In November 2020 he was named one of the best dressed men in New Zealand show business on David Hartnell MNZM's Best Dressed List.

In 2024 he was presented with a Scroll of Honour from the Variety Artists Club of New Zealand for his contribution to New Zealand entertainment and artistic support of many charitable organisations.

== Recognition ==
- 2024 : Scroll of Honour, Variety Artists Club of New Zealand
- 2018 : Presidential Citation : Brotherhood of Auckland Magicians
- 2016 : New Zealand Variety Entertainer of the Year, Variety Artists Club of New Zealand
- 2016 : Franklin Service Hero Award, The Post, Franklin and North Waikato
- 2014 : Special Award For Outstanding Contribution to NZ Magic, Magic New Zealand
- 2014 : New Zealand's Top Children's Entertainer Award, Variety Artists Club of New Zealand
- 2013 : Special Award of Appreciation, Variety Artists Club of New Zealand
- 2011 : New Zealand's Top Children's Entertainer Award, Variety Artists Club of New Zealand
- 2011 : Awesome Service Award for providing inspirational customer service, Auckland Chamber of Commerce
