= Richard Webster =

Richard Webster may refer to:

- Richard Webster, 1st Viscount Alverstone (1842–1915), British barrister, politician and judge
- Richard Webster (rugby) (born 1967), Welsh dual-code international rugby footballer
- Richard Webster (British author) (1950–2011), British author, critic of Sigmund Freud
- Richard Webster (New Zealand author) (born 1946), New Zealand author, ghostwriter and entertainer
- Richard M. Webster (1922–1990), American politician from Missouri
- Richard Webster (athlete) (1914–2009), British Army officer and Olympic pole vaulter
