= Michael Peck =

Michael Peck may refer to:

- Michael Peck (cricketer) (born 1967), former English cricketer
- Michael Peck (priest) (1914–1968), Dean of Lincoln, 1965–1968
- Mick Peck (born 1981), New Zealand magician
- Michael Peck (footballer) (born 2001), English association footballer
