= Eric Compton =

New Zealand police officer (1902-1982)

Eric Henry Compton CVO (14 March 1902 – 2 April 1982) was a New Zealand police officer. He served as Commissioner of Police between 1953 and 1955.

Compton was born in Hastings, New Zealand, on 14 March 1902. In 1953, he was awarded the Queen Elizabeth II Coronation Medal, and in the 1954 Royal Visit Honours he was appointed a Commander of the Royal Victorian Order.

Police appointments
Preceded by Bruce Young	Commissioner of Police of New Zealand; 1953–1955	Succeeded by Samuel Barnett
