= Grand Master of Magic Award =

Lifetime achievement award in New Zealand

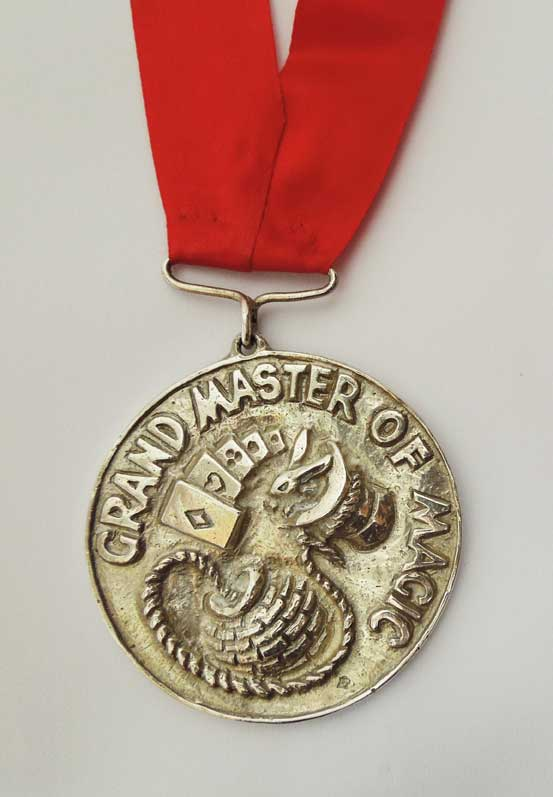
- Grand Master of Magic medallion
- Awarded for: A lifetime of excellence in the magical arts
- Date: 1969
- Country: New Zealand

The Grand Master of Magic Award is a lifetime achievement award presented by the Brotherhood of Auckland Magicians Incorporated on behalf of the magicians of New Zealand. It was first awarded in 1969 and to date it has been awarded on twenty-one occasions.

== Criteria for the Grand Master of Magic ==
The criteria for the Grand Master of Magic Award is as follows :

"Its purpose is to honour those magicians who are acknowledged by their fellow magicians to be masters of the art and craft of magic. The recipients first and foremost must be performers of a high professional standard. In addition they might be originators of magical effects, or administrators giving time and expertise to running societies and conventions. They could be consistent competition winners, or have an international standing, or be known only in the New Zealand setting. But above all they are people who have served magic well, have graced our art, and made a special contribution over many years."

Any nomination must also be measured against the standard achieved by the previous recipients.

== Recipients ==
- 1969 – Edgar Benyon
- 1976 – Jack Read
- 1985 – Jon & Janet Zealando
- 1988 – Jim Reilly
- 1989 – Harold Chandler
- 1990 – Francis Newmarch JP
- 1995 – Peter & Phillipa Evans
- 1998 – Tony Wilson
- 1999 – Graham Grant
- 2001 – Barry Brook QSM
- 2001 – Bernard Reid
- 2002 – Burns Scandrett
- 2004 – Wayne Rogers
- 2006 – Alan Watson QSM
- 2008 – Greg Britt MNZM
- 2009 – Ken Bates
- 2013 – Richard Webster
- 2015 – Paul Romhany
- 2019 – Paul Bates
- 2023 – Guy Cater
- 2026 – Jonathan Usher KSM
