= Richard Webster (New Zealand author) =

New Zealand author, ghostwriter, and magician

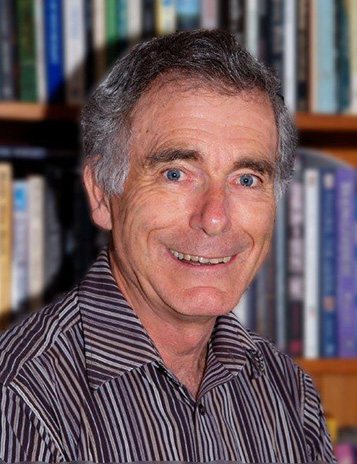
- Born: December 9, 1946 (age 79); Auckland, New Zealand
- Occupations: Author, Ghostwriter, Entertainer
- Website: http://www.psychic.co.nz/

Richard Webster (born December 9, 1946) is a New Zealand author, ghostwriter, mentalist, hypnotist and magician.

== Biography ==
Richard Webster was born in Auckland, New Zealand. He was educated at King's School and King's College. As a child, he wrote and produced a weekly neighbourhood newspaper called The Waiochiel that he sold to his neighbours. He worked in publishing for several years before starting his career as a writer, entertainer, and speaker. He initially worked as a ghost writer, and wrote a small book on the subject. He is the author of 170 books, mainly on New Age topics. He has also written three novels.

His books have been translated into 29 languages: Bulgarian, Chinese (Simplified), Chinese (Traditional), Croatian, Czech, Danish, Dutch, Estonian, French, German, Greek, Hungarian, Bahasa Indonesia, Italian, Japanese, Korean, Latvian, Lithuanian, Polish, Portuguese, Romanian, Russian, Serbian, Slovak, Slovenian, Spanish, Swedish, Thai and Turkish.

Rainbow News described him as "one of the most successful writers in the country". New Idea magazine wrote that Richard is "probably New Zealand's most successful author".

Webster has appeared on numerous radio and TV programs, including Hard Copy, WMAQ-TV (Chicago), KTLA-TV (Los Angeles), KSTW-TV (Seattle), and Mike and Maty (ABC). In 1996, he was one of the performers on The Great Kiwi Magic Show on TV3.

In 2000 the Richard Webster Popular Fiction Award was established, with the winner receiving a $5,000 prize and publication of their winning entry.

Webster is a past president of the New Zealand Society of Magicians. He received the prestigious Grand Master of Magic Award in February 2013.

He is a patron of the International Brotherhood of Magicians Ring 160 Kiwi Magic and the president of the Brotherhood of Auckland Magicians.

== Personal ==
Richard is married with three children and five grandchildren.

== Bibliography ==
=== Non-fiction ===
- Freedom to Read, 1972, HPP Press
- Sun Sign Success, 1982, Brookfield Press
- The Stars and Your Destiny, 1982, Brookfield Press
- How to Read Tea Leaves, 1982, Brookfield Press
- Discovering Numerology, 1983, Brookfield Press
- How to Read Minds, 1986, Brookfield Press
- Secrets of Ghostwriting, 1986, Martin Breese Limited
- How to Develop Your Psychic Power, 1988, Martin Breese Limited
- Good Luck from Beijing, 1990, Martin Breese International
- Revealing Hands, 1994, Llewellyn Publications. Reprinted as The Complete Book of Palmistry, 2001
- Omens, Oghams and Oracles, 1995, Llewellyn Publications
- Talisman Magic, 1995, Llewellyn Publications, Reprinted as Numerology Magic, 1998
- Dowsing for Beginners, 1996, Llewellyn Publications
- Feng Shui for Beginners, 1997, Llewellyn Publications
- Aura Reading for Beginners, 1998, Llewellyn Publications
- Spirit Guides and Angel Guardians, 1998, Llewellyn Publications
- Astral Travel for Beginners, 1998, Llewellyn Publications
- Chinese Numerology, 1998, Llewellyn Publications
- 101 Feng Shui Tips for the Home, 1998, Llewellyn Publications
- Feng Shui for the Workplace, 1998, Llewellyn Publications
- Feng Shui for Apartment Living, 1998, Llewellyn Publications
- Feng Shui in the Garden, 1999, Llewellyn Publications
- Feng Shui for Love and Romance, 1999, Llewellyn Publications
- Feng Shui for Success and Happiness, 1999, Llewellyn Publications
- Palm Reading for Beginners, 2000, Llewellyn Publications
- Writing as a Business, 2000, Brookfield Press
- Practical Guide to Past-Life Memories, 2001, Llewellyn Publications
- Soul Mates, 2001, Llewellyn Publications
- Write Your Own Magic, 2001, Llewellyn Publications
- Is Your Pet Psychic?, 2002, Llewellyn Publications
- Pendulum Magic for Beginners, 2002, Llewellyn Publications
- Playing Card Divination for Beginners, 2002, Llewellyn Publications
- How to Write for the New Age Market, 2003, Llewellyn Publications
- Amulets and Talismans for Beginners, 2004, Llewellyn Publications
- Miracles, 2004, Llewellyn Publications
- Candle Magic for Beginners, 2004, Llewellyn Publications
- Communicating with the Archangel Michael for Guidance & Protection, 2004, Llewellyn Publications
- Communicating with the Archangel Raphael for Healing & Creativity, 2005, Llewellyn Publications
- Communicating with the Archangel Gabriel for Inspiration & Reconciliation, 2005, Llewellyn Publications
- Communicating with the Archangel Uriel for Transformation & Tranquility, 2005, Llewellyn Publications
- Creative Visualization for Beginners, 2005, Llewellyn Publications
- Magical Symbols of Love & Romance, 2006, Llewellyn Publications
- Color Magic for Beginners, 2006, Llewellyn Publications
- How To Remember Jokes, 2006, Brookfield Press
- Praying with Angels, 2007, Llewellyn Publications
- Flower and Tree Magic, 2008, Llewellyn Publications
- The Encyclopedia of Superstitions, 2008, Llewellyn Publications
- Encyclopedia of Angels, 2009, Llewellyn Publications
- Prayer for Beginners, 2009, Llewellyn Publications
- Psychic Protection for Beginners, 2010, Llewellyn Publications
- You Can Read Palms, 2010, Llewellyn Publications
- The Complete Book of Auras, 2010, Llewellyn Publications
- Spirit & Dream Animals, 2011, Llewellyn Publications
- Geomancy for Beginners, 2011, Llewellyn Publications
- Face Reading Quick & Easy, 2012, Llewellyn Publications
- Living in Your Soul's Light, 2012, Llewellyn Publications
- All About Self-Hypnosis, 2012, Llewellyn Publications
- Body Language Quick & Easy, 2014, Llewellyn Publications
- Oracle of the Angels, 2014, Llewellyn Publications
- 365 Ways To Attract Good Luck, 2014, Llewellyn Publications
- Mind Magic And Memory Stunts You Can Do, 2014, Brookfield Press
- Mind Reading Quick & Easy, 2015, Llewellyn Publications
- Rituals For Beginners, 2016, Llewellyn Publications
- Legacy : How to Write and Publish Your Life Story, 2016, Brookfield Press
- Angels For Beginners, 2017, Llewellyn Publications
- Llewellyn's Complete Book of Divination, 2017, Llewellyn Publications
- Humour In Action : How To Have More Fun At Work, 2017, Brookfield Press
- Twenty-Five Ways To Sell More Pitch Books, 2017, Brookfield Press
- How To Use A Crystal : 50 Practical Rituals and Spiritual Activities for Inspiration and Wellbeing, 2018, Llewellyn Publications
- Las Vegas Notes 2019, 2019, Brookfield Press
- The Walkaround Mentalist's Toolbox, 2019, Brookfield Press
- Scryer's Elite, 2019, Brookfield Press
- Potential in the Palm of Your Hand, 2019, Llewellyn Publications
- How To Use A Pendulum : 50 Practical Rituals and Spiritual Activities for Clarity and Guidance, 2020, Llewellyn Publications
- The End : Scryer's Confidants, 2020, Brookfield Press
- The Psychic Reader's Toolbox, 2020, Brookfield Press
- The Secret to Attracting Luck, 2021, Llewellyn Publications
- Scryer's Grey Book, 2021, Brookfield Press
- Scryer's Secrets, 2022, Brookfield Press
- Archangels: How to Invoke & Work with Angelic Messengers, 2022, Llewellyn Publications
- Scryer's Eidolon, 2022, Brookfield Press
- Guardian Angels : How To Contact And Work With Angelic Protectors, 2022, Llewellyn Publications
- Scryer Goes Impromptu, 2023, Llewellyn Publications
- Scryer's Soothsayers, 2023, Llewellyn Publications
- An Angel for Anything, 2024, Llewellyn Publications
- Fred Webster's Family, 2024, Brookfield Press
- Scryer's Sorceries, 2025, Brookfield Press
- Llewellyn's Little Book of Numerology, 2025, Llewellyn Publications
- Llewellyn's Little Book of Pendulums, 2026, Llewellyn Publications

=== Fiction ===
- Seven Secrets to Success, 1997, Llewellyn Publications
- Success Secrets, 2001, Llewellyn Publications
- Enemy Within, 2002, Hazard Press

== Magic and mentalism ==
Richard has written 56 books for magicians and mentalists, many cited as modern-day classics. He has also marketed several effects and produced CDs and DVDs of his techniques and effects. He has ghostwritten magic books for other performers, and he has written several magic books using different pen names. His magic effects have been published in many industry magazines including Abracadabra, Alakazam, Genii, The Linking Ring, Magicana, Magick, Magigram, Magic New Zealand, The Magic Circular, Mind Over Magic, New Invocation, Seance, Vanish and Vibrations.

== Ghostwriting ==
Richard made his living as a ghostwriter for several years and has ghosted 30 books on a wide variety of subjects.

== Richard Webster Popular Fiction Book Award ==
In 2000 Webster in conjunction with Hazard Press, established the annual Richard Webster Popular Fiction Award competition, which ran for five years. The winning author each year received $5,000, plus publication of their winning entry by Hazard Press.

== Awards ==
The Dunninger Memorial Award for Distinguished Professionalism in the Performance of Mentalism. Presented by the Psychic Entertainers Association, June 9, 1990.

Variety Artists Club of New Zealand Scroll of Honour 1994.

Variety Artists Club of New Zealand Top Specialty Act 1997.

Dan Blackwood Memorial Award for Outstanding Contribution to the Art of Mentalism presented by the Psychic Entertainers Association, June 2007.

Lifetime Achievement Award in recognition of a lifetime dedicated to excellence in writing magical literature. Presented by Magic New Zealand, December 2008.

Convention of Visionary Retailers Visionary Awards - Best Divination Book 2012 - Spirit and Dream Animals by Richard Webster, June 2012.

Grand Master of Magic Award presented by the Brotherhood of Auckland Magicians and the magicians of New Zealand, February 2013.

The Annemann Award for Mentalism presented by Stevens Magic Emporium, Kansas, March 2014.
