= David Hartnell =

David Hartnell MNZM
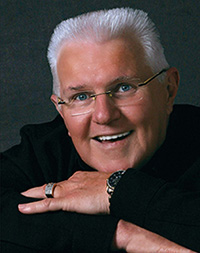
- Born: 29 June 1944 (age 82); Sandringham, Auckland, New Zealand
- Occupations: Journalist, gossip columnist
- Website: davidhartnell.com

David Harold Ward Hartnell MNZM (born 29 June 1944) is a New Zealand journalist and media personality best known for his Hollywood gossip column and best-dressed lists. He was the first full-time celebrity gossip columnist in New Zealand and his work appeared in print, radio and television. His syndicated columns have run in magazines and newspapers around the world. Hartnell is the author of ten books, the Patron of the Variety Artists Club of New Zealand Inc and the Ambassador of St James Saviours. In April 2014 he was named Ambassador of the Prostate Cancer Foundation of New Zealand and in September 2016 the Patron of the Brotherhood of Auckland Magicians Inc.

In May 2021 he received a star on the New Zealand Walk of Fame in Orewa.

In November 2026 he was presented the Benny Award from the Variety Artists Club of New Zealand, the highest honour for a New Zealand entertainer.

== Biography ==
Hartnell was born in the Auckland suburb of Sandringham in 1944 as David Segetin. As a child he became interested in magic and roller-skating. He was raised by his mother and grandparents after his father left when he was young. He later discovered a half-brother and sister who knew nothing of his existence. In 1959 he was a runner-up in the dance pairs at the World Roller Skating Championships in Christchurch.

After moving to Sydney he found a position with Revlon and became Australia's first in-store male make-up artist. He made-up comedian Phyllis Diller as a publicity stunt and the pair became lifelong friends. After a sojourn in Hong Kong, Hartnell moved to London and worked as a makeup artist for instore promotions, magazine shoots and the 1970 Miss World pageant. He moved to New York for a position with Maybelline and then relocated to Los Angeles. It was at this time that Hartnell began to interview the celebrities he met.

Returning to New Zealand in 1975, Hartnell became involved with TVNZ television shows Town Cryer and Two on One and became a celebrity himself. He became involved with radio with weekly slots on Radio Pacific and Radio i and later appeared with radio personality Alice Worsley on New Zealand's first-ever television shopping show. His Hollywood gossip columns appeared in NZ Woman's Weekly, Woman's Day and the Sunday News and his catchphrases "I'm not one to gossip but..." and "my lips are sealed" became part of New Zealand popular culture. In 1981, Hartnell began his popular New Zealand's best- and worst-dressed lists, a yearly celebration of Kiwi celebrities that has become a tradition.

He was the chairman of the judges for the Miss New Zealand contest between 1982 and 1987.

In 1995 he fronted The David Hartnell Show, a chat show on New Zealand's Triangle Television.

In 2009 Hartnell became a patron of the Variety Artists Club of New Zealand Inc.

In the 2011 Queen's Birthday Honours, he was appointed a Member of the New Zealand Order of Merit, for services to entertainment. His book Memoirs of a Gossip Columnist was published in 2011.

In September 2012 Hartnell was named an Ambassador of St James Saviours, the trust formed to save the iconic Auckland theatre. In April 2014 he was named Ambassador of the Prostate Cancer Foundation of New Zealand.

In September 2016 he was made patron of the Brotherhood of Auckland Magicians Inc.

In October 2017 he was presented with the President's Medallion from the Variety Artists Club of New Zealand in recognition of his services as Patron.

In 2020 he became a regular guest on Three's The AM Show with the Hartnell's Hollywood segment.

He has lived with his partner Somboon Khansuk since 1993. They married on 20th August 2026.

== Awards and honours ==
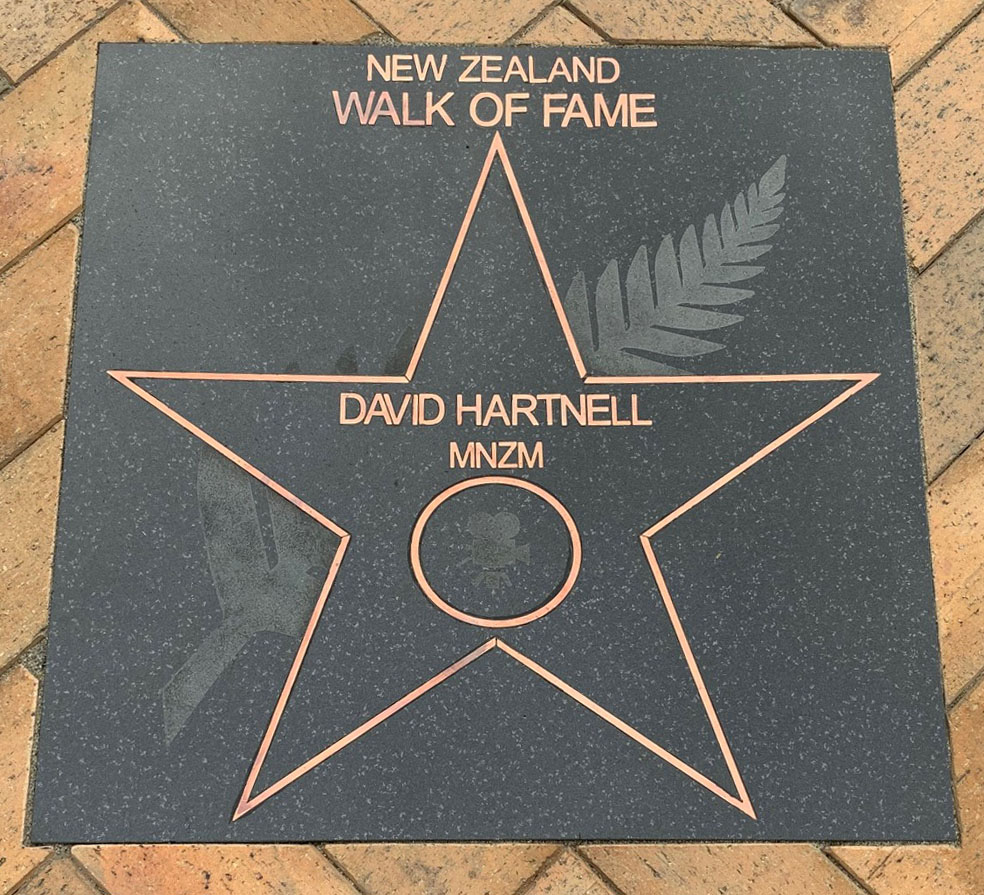
David Hartnell's star on the New Zealand Walk of Fame

- 2026 Benny Award from the Variety Artists Club of New Zealand
- 2021 Star on New Zealand Walk of Fame, Orewa
- 2021 Presidential Citation, Brotherhood of Auckland Magicians Inc
- 2017 President's Medallion, Variety Artists Club of New Zealand Inc
- 2016 Patron Brotherhood of Auckland Magicians
- 2014 Ambassador of the Prostate Cancer Foundation of New Zealand
- 2013 Fullers Entertainment Award, Variety Artists Club of New Zealand Inc
- 2012 Ambassador of St James Saviours
- 2011 Honorary member of the official Emmerdale Fan Club UK
- 2011 Member of the New Zealand Order of Merit
- 2011 Star on Walk of Fame at Boulevard of Dreams
- 2009 Patron Variety Artists Club of New Zealand Inc
- 2000 Auckland Planet Hollywood Hall of Fame
- 1998 Scroll of Honour, Variety Artists Club of New Zealand Inc
- 1985 Greymouth Walk of Fame and Key to the City

== Publications ==
- 2014 David Hartnell's Celebrity Quiz Book
- 2011 Memoirs of a Gossip Columnist
- 2003 David Hartnell's Hollywood Trivia
- 1997 David Hartnell's Celebrity Fact-File
- 1990 I'm Not One to Gossip, But …
- 1984 David Hartnell's Guide to Beauty
- 1979 Beauty from 30 to 90
- 1978 David Hartnell's Book of Beauty
- 1975 David Hartnell on Makeup for New Zealand Women
- 1968 David Hartnell's Makeup and Skin Care Cards

== Television career and appearances ==
- Seven Sharp, 2021, Star on the New Zealand Walk of Fame
- Seven Sharp, 2021, Royal Family Oprah interview fallout
- The AM Show, 2020, career profile and regular Hartnell's Hollywood segment
- Seven Sharp, 2020, career profile
- Te Ao with Moana, 2020, story on Prince Tui Teka
- Native Affairs, 2017, feature on Merle Oberon
- Te Radar's Chequered Past, 2017, feature on Anna Hoffman
- Paul Henry, 2015, Annual Best-Dressed List
- Seven Sharp, 2015, Feature story on the Orewa Walk of Fame
- Paul Henry, 2015, Celebrity panel
- Good Morning, 2014, Celebrity Quiz Book
- The Paul Henry Show, 2014, Recent Best-Dressed List and Celebrity Quiz Book
- The Beat Goes On, 2014, Profiled as the only gossip columnist that has been awarded by the Queen
- The Beat Goes On, 2011, Star on the Orewa Walk of Fame
- 3 News, 2011
- Close Up, 2011
- Happy Birthday TVNZ, 2010
- The David Hartnell Show, series on Triangle TV, 2004
- Maggie’s Garden Show, guest appearance, 1999
- 60 Minutes, 1997
- The Express Report, 1996
- Good Morning, Celebrity Gossip regular for three years plus guest appearances
- The EarlyBird Show
- The Billy T. James Show
- Saunders and Sinclair, 1985 – Makeup Artist and Celebrity Gossip
- Tonight, 1985
- Kaye and Guest, 1979
- Two on One, 1975 – Makeup Artist and Celebrity Gossip
- Town Cryer
