= 1954 New Zealand Royal Visit Honours =

1954 Royal Visit Honours
- Previous: 1954 New Year Honours; Next: 1954 bravery awards
- Type: New Zealand royal honours: Royal Victorian Order
- Date: 15–29 January 1954
- Country: New Zealand
- Total recipients: 27

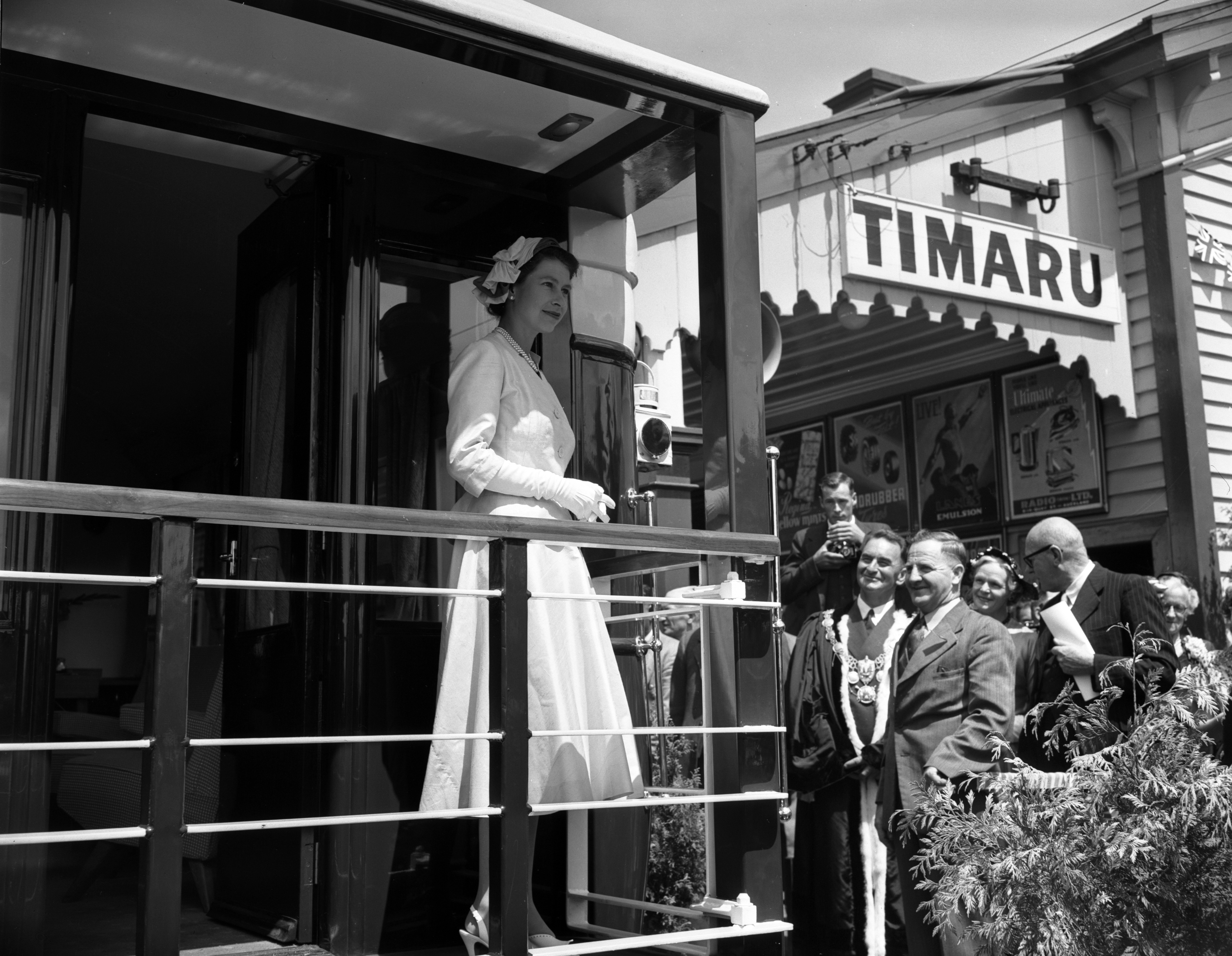
The Queen on the royal train at Timaru Railway Station during her 1953–54 tour of New Zealand

The 1954 New Zealand Royal Visit Honours were appointments by Elizabeth II to the Royal Victorian Order, to mark her visit to New Zealand in the summer of 1953–1954. During her visit, she visited 46 towns and cities. The honours were announced between 15 January and 29 January 1954.

The recipients of honours are displayed here as they were styled before their new honour.

== Royal Victorian Order ==
=== Knight Grand Cross (GCVO) ===
- Lieutenant-General Sir (Charles) Willoughby (Moke) Norrie GCMG CB DSO MC – governor-general and commander-in-chief of New Zealand
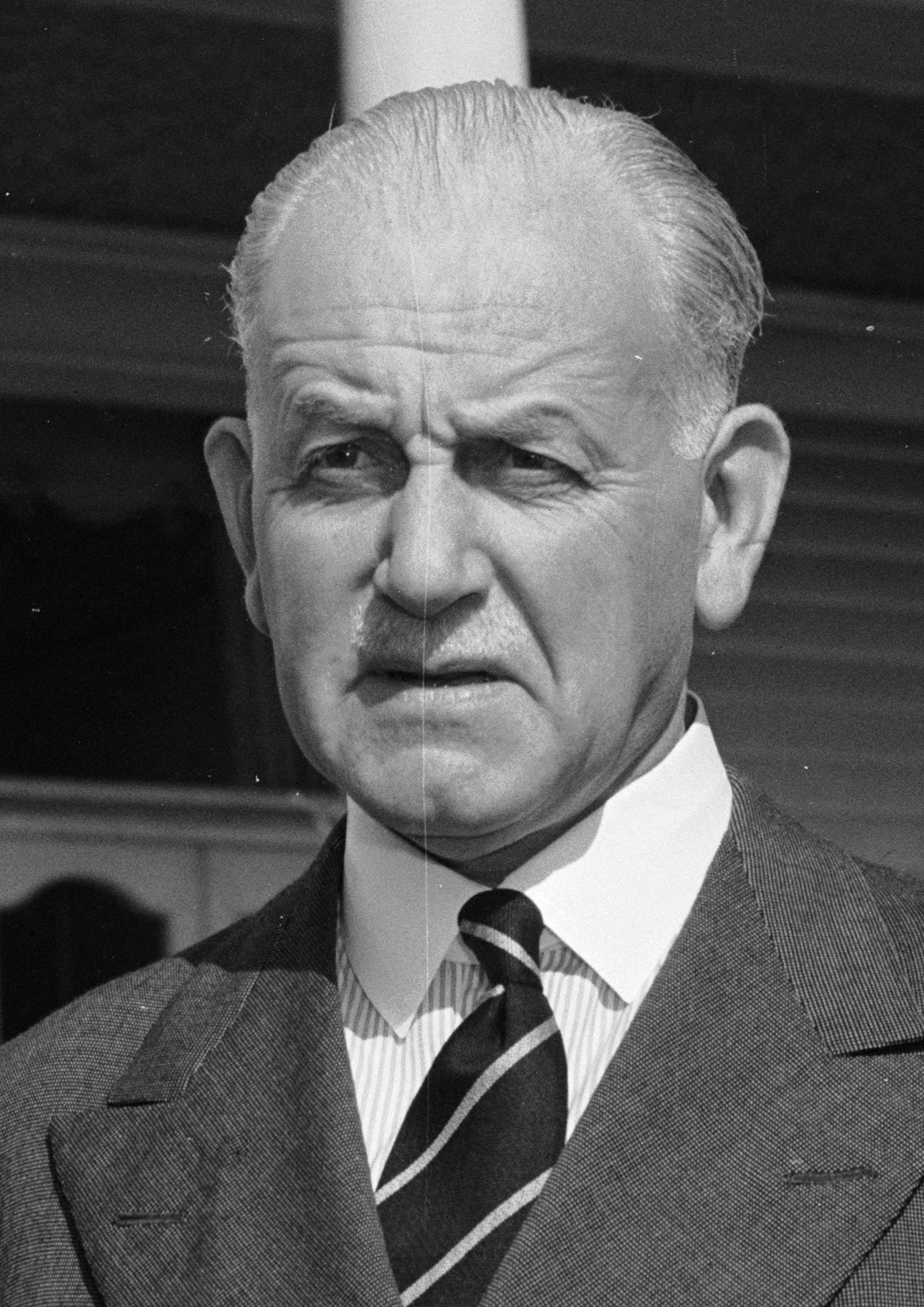
Sir Willoughby Norrie

=== Knight Commander (KCVO) ===
- William Alexander Bodkin MP – of Alexandra
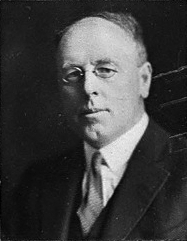
Sir William Bodkin

=== Commander (CVO) ===
- Eric Henry Compton – commissioner, New Zealand Police Force; of Wellington
- David Emmet Fouhy CBE – of Wellington
- Arthur Grant Harper – of Wellington
- Major Michael Augustus Tulk Trasenster – 4th/7th Royal Dragoon Guards; of Wellington

=== Member, fourth class (MVO) ===
- Clement Anthony Furlong – of Wellington
- Percy James Nalder – assistant commissioner, New Zealand Police Force; of Wellington

In 1984, Members of the Royal Victorian Order, fourth class, were redesignated as Lieutenants of the Royal Victorian Order (LVO).

=== Member, fifth class (MVO) ===
- Inspector Willis Spencer Brown – New Zealand Police Force; of Wellington
- Squadron Leader John Te Herekiekie Grace – Royal New Zealand Air Force; of Wellington
- Major Noel Rodney Ingle – New Zealand Military Forces; of Trentham
- Betty Nora Manning – of Wellington
- William Laurie Middlemass – of Auckland
- Patrick Jerad O'Dea – of Lower Hutt
- Peter John Hope Purvis BEM – of Wellington
- Flight Lieutenant Bruce William Thomas Richards MBE – Royal New Zealand Air Force; of Wellington
- Squadron Leader Cyril Laurence Siegert DFC AFC – Royal New Zealand Air Force; of Whenuapai
- William Graham Taylor – of Wellington
- Captain Henry Campbell Walker AFC – New Zealand National Airways Corporation; of Lower Hutt
- Charles Henry Williams – of Wellington
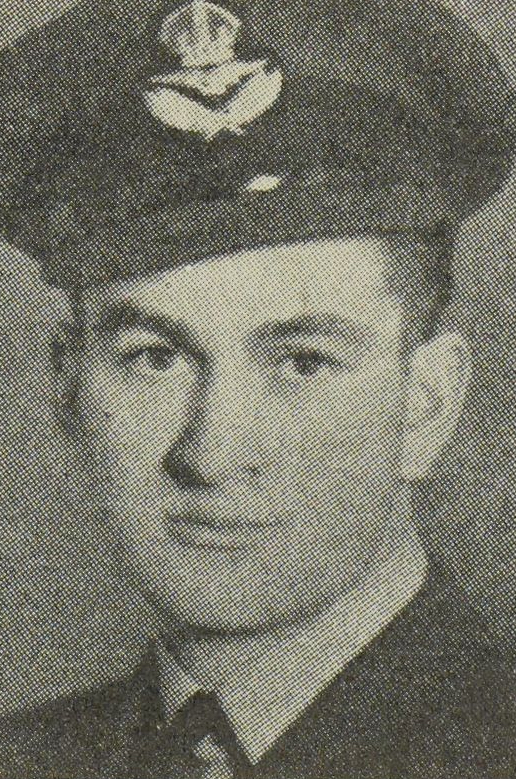
Larry Siegert

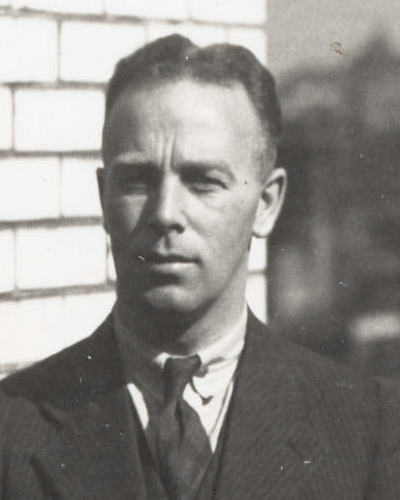
Henry Walker

== Royal Victorian Medal ==
=== Silver (RVM) ===
- John Baxendale – of Auckland
- Allan Stewart Dawson – of Wellington
- Detective Sergeant Alan Robertson Grant – New Zealand Police Force; of Christchurch
- John Nathaniel George Mounsey – of Auckland
- Warrant Officer First Class Albert Edward Naulls BEM – New Zealand Army; of Wellington
- Henry Richard Rump – of Wellington
- Horace Joseph Stevenson – of Wellington
