= Paul Romhany =

New Zealand magician

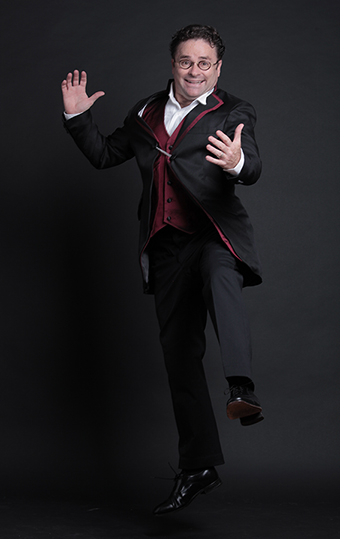
- Born: 25 October 1968 (age 57); Auckland, New Zealand
- Education: University of Auckland
- Occupations: Magician, author, speaker
- Website: http://www.chaplinmagic.com/

Paul Romhany (born 25 October 1968) is a New Zealand-born magician best known for his Charlie Chaplin magic act. He has been awarded many industry awards including the PCAM Gold Medal and the Variety Artists Club of New Zealand Top Variety Act award. Paul has entertained the royal family of Monaco, performed at the famous Magic Castle in Hollywood, and appeared in over 100 countries.

== Biography ==
Paul Romhany was born in 1968 in Auckland, New Zealand. At the age of eight he saw his first Charlie Chaplin film, The Circus, attended a live magic show, and became interested in ventriloquism. He joined the Shore City Magicians Club, a magic club with a focus on youth. At the age twelve Paul won his first talent quest and began to perform semi-professionally.

He graduated from Auckland University with a Bachelor of Music degree in 1990 and a Diploma in Teaching from Auckland Teachers Training College in 1991.

Paul's first break in showbusiness came when he toured New Zealand and Australia as part of the World Festival of Magic show alongside American performers Chuck Jones and Ricki Dunn, who became a lifelong friend and mentor.

After many years of experimenting with different performing styles and characters Paul decided to concentrate on a Charlie Chaplin silent magic act, for which he has become internationally known.

Paul has written over 24 books, including a best-selling book for the general public on cat readings. Paul releases a new book each month as part of his Pro-Series range of books for magicians. He has released over fifty original magic effects and routines, ranging from close-up to stage. He regularly lectures to magic clubs, and consults for magicians for both television and stage.

In 2012 he created 'Vanish' magazine, a free downloadable trade magazine for magicians. 'Vanish' is read by over 80,000 magicians worldwide.

In June 2013 VanishLive was launched. VanishLive is a daily roundup of magic news from around the globe plus articles and reviews of magic products, tricks, DVDs etc.

In October 2015 Paul Romhany was presented with the Grand Master of Magic Award, the highest honour for a New Zealand magician.

== Awards and honours ==
- 2015 Grand Master of Magic Award, New Zealand's highest honour for a magician
- 2014 Robert Houdin Award, presented by Stevens Magic Emporium, Kansas, March 2013
- 2012 Variety Artists Club of New Zealand Top Variety Act
- 2003 PCAM Gold Medal, People's Choice Award
- 1992 Variety Artists Club of New Zealand Rising Star Award

== Publications ==
- The Real Deal - 2012
- Flown Away - 2012
- How To Tell Anybody's Personality By The Way They Laugh And Speak - 2011
- Briefcase Illusion - 2011
- Top Ten Travel Picks - 2011
- Performing Mentalism for Young Minds Vl. 2 - 2011
- Mental Epic Compendium - 2010
- Extreme Magic MakeOver - 2010
- Performing Mentalism for Young Minds Vl. 1- 2010
- Magic from Down Under - 2009
- Lunch Is Served - 2009
- Extreme Magic Makeover - 2009
- Entertaining On a Cruise Ship - Edition 1 - 2008
- Laughter in the Workplace - 2008
- Secrets of a Walk About Ventriloquist - 2004
- Pawmistry - 1998

Pro-Series Books :

- SwitchBoard Clipboard
- Winning Numbers
- Multiplying Bottles
- Signed Card on Blue Stake
- Bearly Impossible
- Bill 2 Can
- Color Change Hanky
- Headline Prediction
- Orange, Lemon, Egg & Canary
- Six Card Repeat

DVDs :

- Multiplying Bottles with DVD and Audio CD
- Romhany On Stage
- Lunch Date
- Minuette Aces
