= Bruce Young (police officer) =

New Zealand baker and policeman

John Bruce Young (25 August 1888 – 28 December 1952) was a notable New Zealand baker, policeman, unionist and police commissioner. He was born in Kaiapoi, North Canterbury, New Zealand in 1888. He was Commissioner of Police from 4 April 1950. He died in office after a period of sickness.

In 1935, Young was awarded the King George V Silver Jubilee Medal.

Police appointments
Preceded by James Cummings	Commissioner of Police; 1950–1952	Succeeded by Eric Compton
