= 1953–1954 royal tour of New Zealand =

Tour by Queen Elizabeth II and Prince Philip

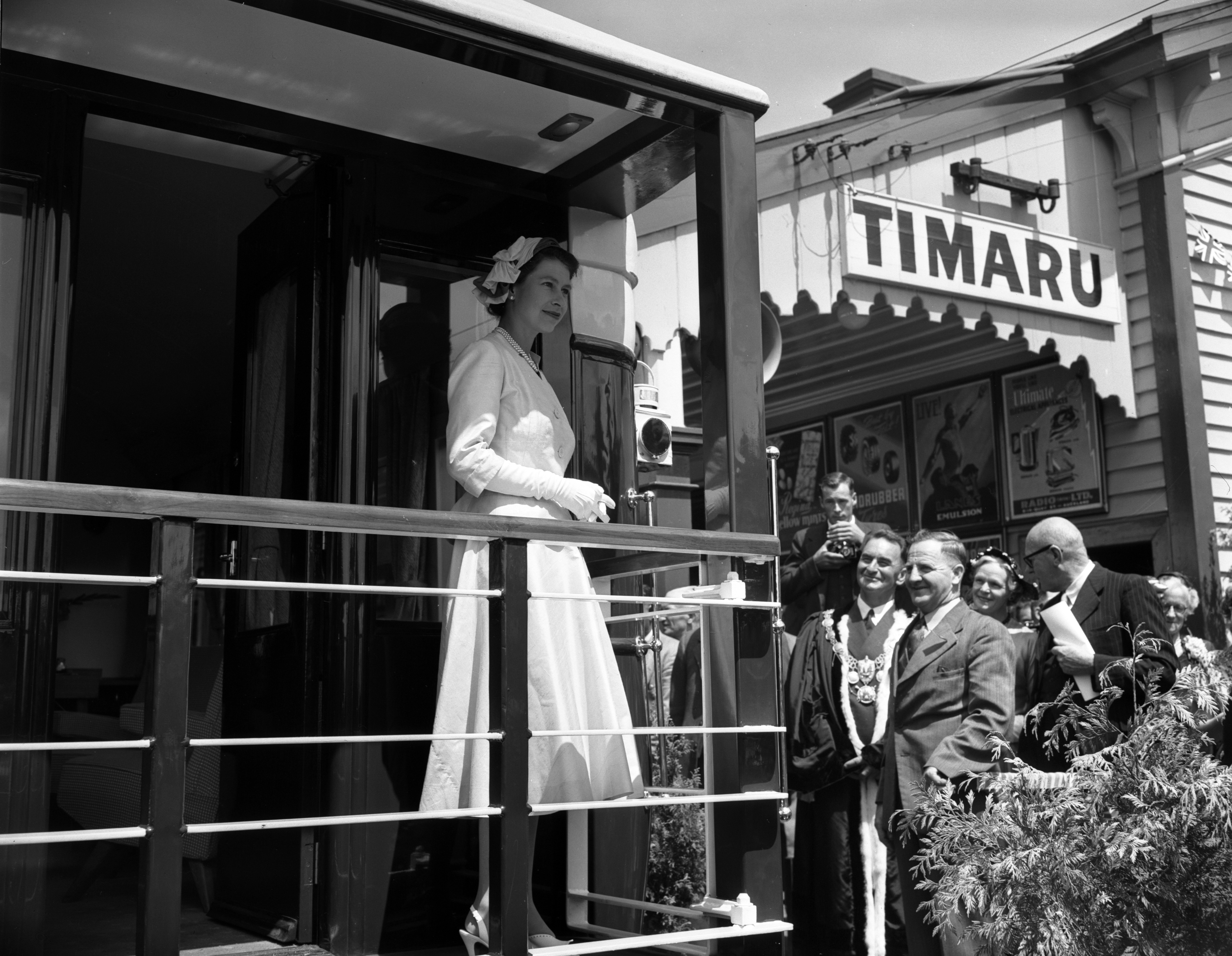
Queen Elizabeth II shortly before departing Timaru on the royal train on 25 January 1954

Queen Elizabeth II and her husband, Prince Philip, Duke of Edinburgh, toured New Zealand from 23 December 1953 to 30 January 1954. This was the first visit to New Zealand by its reigning monarch. It occurred six months after Elizabeth II's coronation and was part of her six-month tour of the Commonwealth. Elizabeth and Philip visited 46 towns or cities and travelled over 2,000 kilometres (1,200 mi) by car, 1,200 km (750 mi) by aeroplane and 960 km (600 mi) by train. According to the Ministry for Culture and Heritage, an estimated three out of every four New Zealanders saw the royal couple during their tour.

== Background ==
This was the first time that a reigning monarch had visited New Zealand. An itinerary had previously been made for a visit by George VI in 1949, but it was cancelled due to illness. The 1953–1954 royal tour occurred six months after Elizabeth II's coronation and was part of her six month tour of the Commonwealth. The Queen later visited New Zealand eight other times, the next being in 1963 and the last being in 2002.

== Itinerary ==
=== Auckland and Northland ===
The Queen and Prince Philip at the garden party at Government House

In the morning of 23 December 1953, SS Gothic arrived in Auckland with the Queen and Prince Philip aboard. The two were officially welcomed in a civic reception at Auckland Town Hall. After noon at Government House in Auckland, a presentation was made about the tour and press parties were held. That day she shook approximately 300 hands.

In the morning of 24 December there was a visit to Auckland Hospital and a youth gathering at Auckland Domain. After noon she presented her Queen's Colour to the Royal New Zealand Navy at Devonport Naval Base, and there was a garden reception at Government House. At 10.21 pm the Tangiwai disaster occurred, New Zealand's deadliest railway accident that killed 151 people.

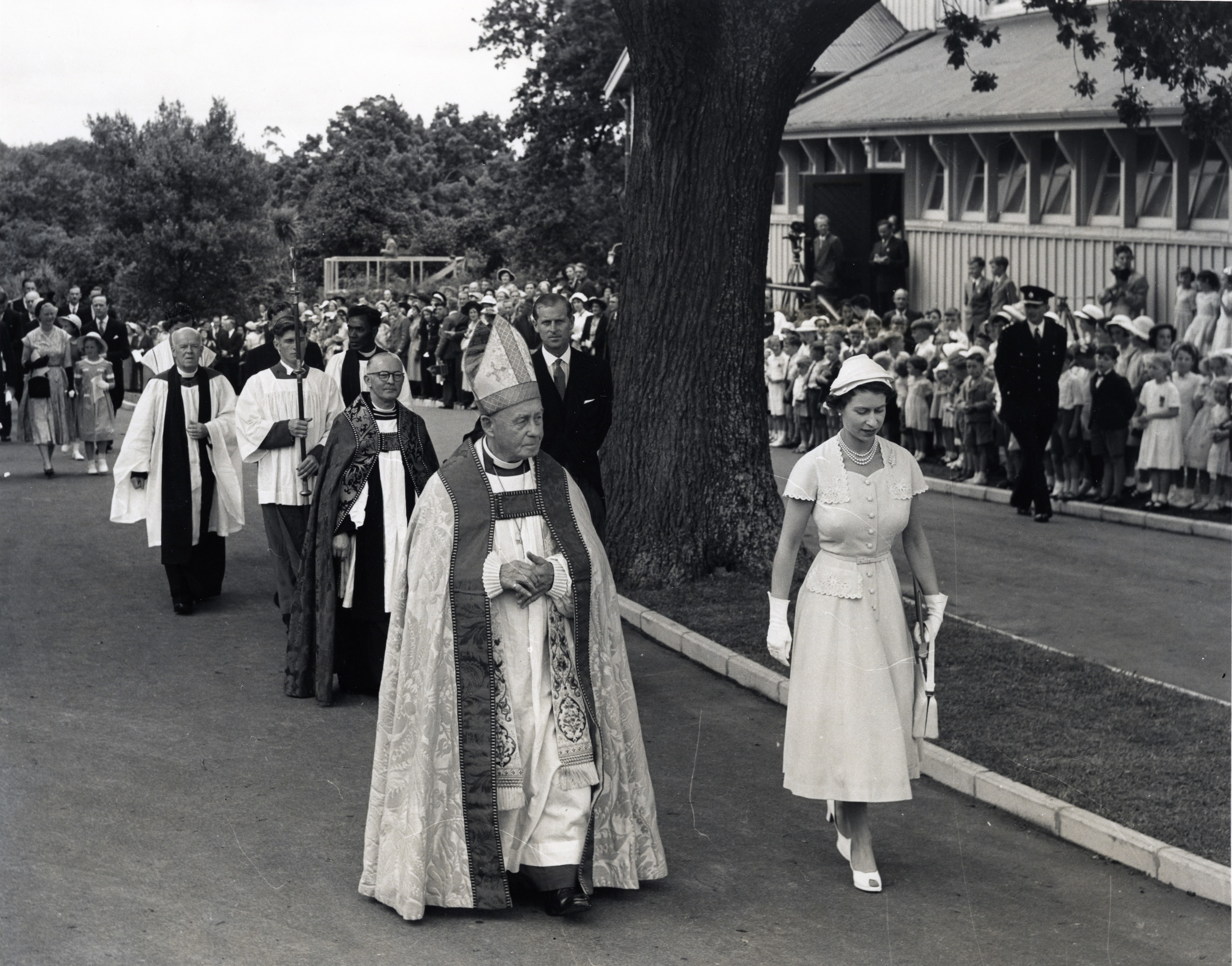
Elizabeth II and Anglican Bishop of Auckland John Simkin at St Mary's Cathedral in Auckland

In the morning of 25 December, Christmas, a divine service was held at St Mary's Cathedral in Auckland. In the afternoon the Queen delivered her Christmas message from Government House. She spoke of her trip so far and what she hoped to learn and accomplish from the tour. The Queen referred to the Crown as a "personal and loving bond" between herself and her people and spoke of feeling at home in Auckland despite its distance from London. She spoke of the Commonwealth as a "fellowship" which bears no resemblance to the empires of the past and in which Britain is but an equal partner. She finished the broadcast with a note of sympathy to those affected by the Tangiwai disaster the night before. This was the only time that Elizabeth II spent Christmas outside of the UK.

On 26 December the Queen and Prince Philip watched thoroughbred races at the Auckland Racing Club. In the evening a Royal Cinema Performance was held at St James Theatre. The building's facade and vestibule underwent renovation for the royal couple's visit.

On 27 December In the morning a divine service was held at St Mary's Cathedral. The royal couple spent the day relaxing.

The Queen delivering a speech on 28 December

In the morning of 28 December a Presentation of Colours was held at Whenuapai Airbase. An aeroplane trip was made to Kaikohe and in the afternoon a car trip was made to Waitangi where a ceremony was held, in view of approximately 5,000 spectators. The Queen wore a kiwi feather cloak which led to some criticism from some Māori saying that it was against tradition. National Minister Ernest Corbett and Hone Heke Rankin of Ngāpuhi each delivered a welcoming speech. Rankin went off script and requested that the Queen and Duke visit the Māori King's marae at Tūrangawaewae. The itinerary originally did not have a visit to Waitangi, but it was later added after Māori criticised its absence and a letter was written to Buckingham Palace suggesting that a visit be held there. Afternoon tea was later held at Treaty House and a civic reception was held at Whangārei.

In the morning of 29 December the royal couple was transported by car from Whangārei to Warkworth, where a public welcoming was held. In the afternoon the royals travelled to Wenderholm, by car, where they had a picnic. An investiture was held at Auckland Town Hall.

In the morning of 30 December the royal couple travelled by car to Pukekohe, where a public welcoming occurred. They also visited Tūrangawaewae.

=== Waikato ===
In the afternoon of 30 December, they royal couple travelled to Alton Lodge in Te Kauwhata, Waikato, where they had lunch. They later travelled to Huntly, where they had a public welcoming. They then went to Tūrangawaewae and Ngāruawāhia to visit the pā, and Hamilton, where they had a civic dinner and attended a "youth fiesta".

Prince Philip at Karori Cemetery

In the morning of 31 December, a civic reception and agricultural display at Claudelands Show Grounds in Hamilton was attended. A public welcoming occurred in Te Kūiti after they had travelled there by car. Prince Philip travelled by air to Wellington to attend a funeral for the victims of the Tangiwai disaster that had happened a week earlier. Later, the two went to the Waitomo Caves and visited the glowworm cave and Aranui Cave. They stayed the night at Waitomo Caves Hotel.

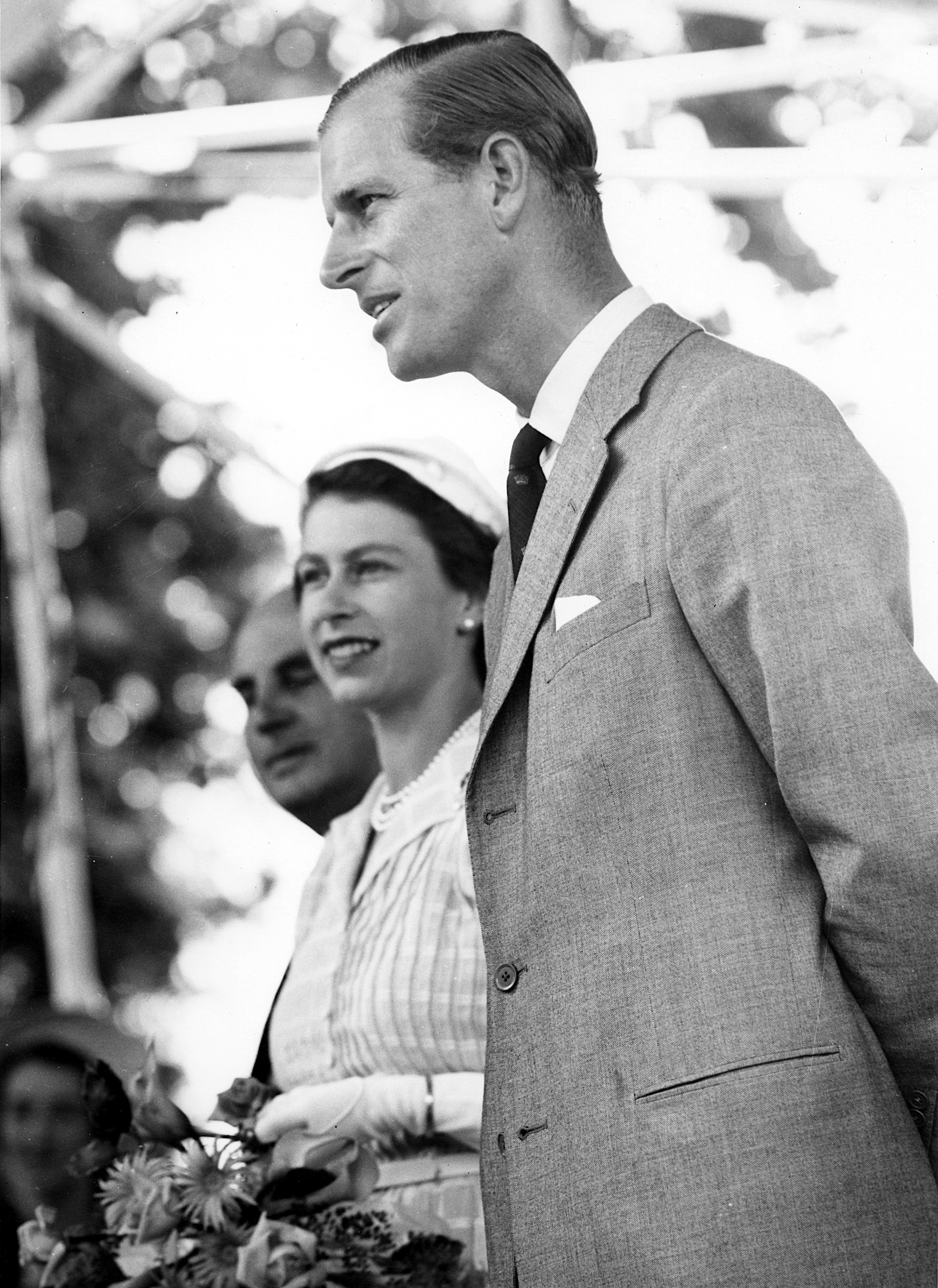
Prince Philip and the Queen in Cambridge on 1 January

In the morning of 1 January the two travelled by car to Te Awamutu where a public welcoming was held, and Cambridge, where another public welcoming was held as well as a civic luncheon. In the afternoon they visited Karāpiro Power Station. They later travelled by car to Tīrau, which had a crowd of 10,000 people despite the town having a population of only 600.

=== Bay of Plenty ===
The royal couple travelled to Moose Lodge at Lake Rotoiti on 1 January.

In the morning of 2 January a civic reception and luncheon was held in Rotorua. In the afternoon a Māori reception was held at Arawa Park, also in Rotorua.

In the morning of 3 January a divine service was held at St John’s Presbyterian Church in Rotorua. In the afternoon the royal couple visited the Whakarewarewa model village and viewed the thermal activity in the area. That day the queen became the first woman to speak at Te Arawa Marae in Rotorua.

The days 4 and 5 January were spent relaxing at Moose Lodge at Lake Rotoiti. The royal couple had no official engagements.

=== Gisborne, Hawke's Bay, Manawatū-Whanganui and Taranaki ===
The queen in Gisborne with Mayor Harry Barker

On 6 January the royal couple travelled by car to Gisborne Airport, where a civic reception was held. They then travelled by air to Napier, where a civic reception was held. Prince Philip met former Hawke's Bay naval officers.

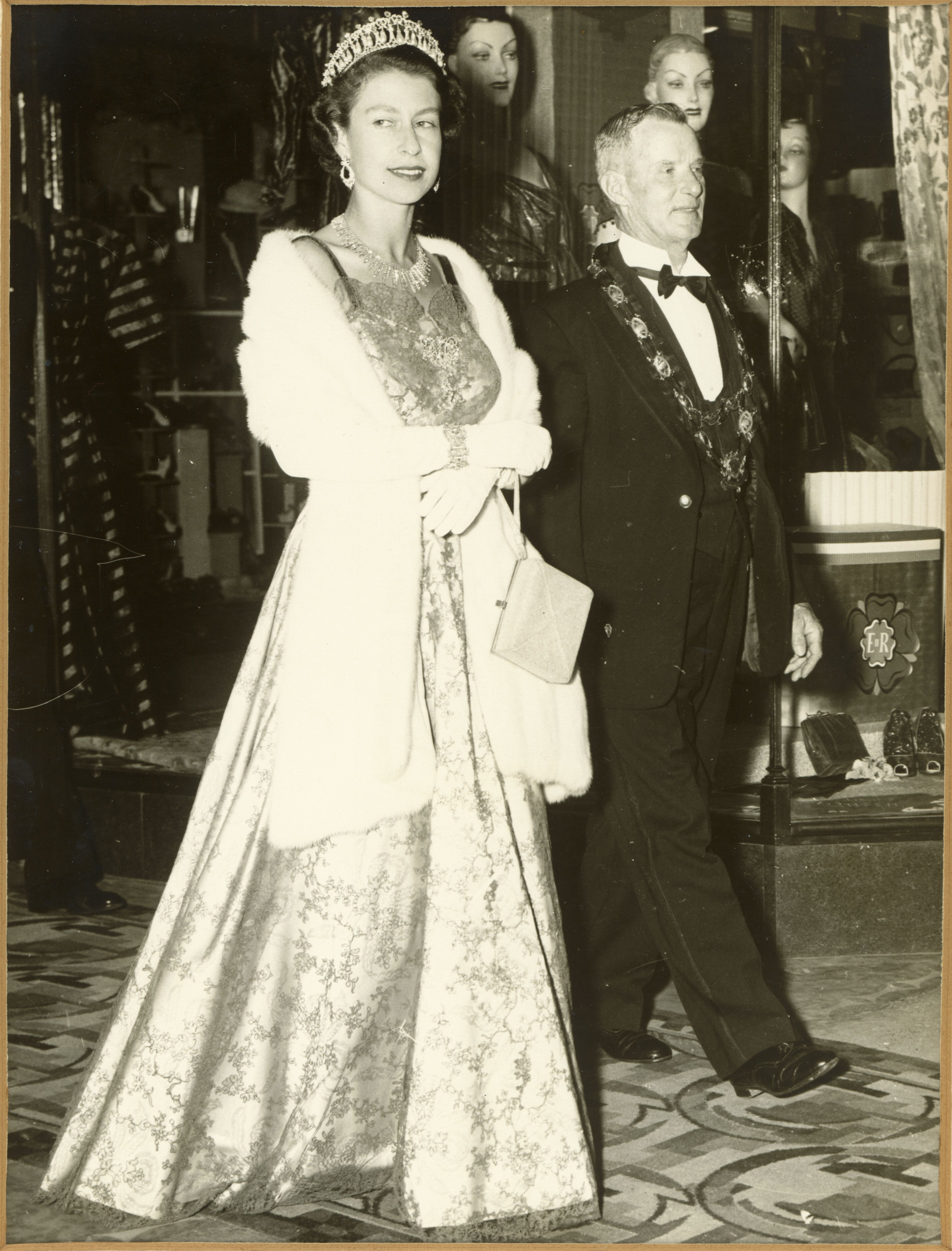
The Queen in Palmerston North with the city's mayor Geoffrey Tremaine

In the morning of 7 January the two travelled by car to Hastings, where they were given a public welcoming and a tour of the Wattie's cannery by the company's founder James Wattie. In the afternoon they travelled by train to Palmerston North with stops at Waipawa, Waipukurau, Dannevirke and Woodville along the way. At each of these towns they had a public welcoming. In Palmerston North, a civic reception and dinner was held.

On 8 January they travelled by train to Feilding, Marton, Whanganui, Pātea, Hāwera, Stratford and New Plymouth.

On 9 January they toured the dairy factory in Bell Block in the morning and had a civic reception at Pukekura Park near New Plymouth.

=== Wellington ===
In the afternoon of 9 January the royal couple travelled by aeroplane to Paraparaumu Airport and then by car to Wellington. Wellington Airport was non-operational so they flew to Paraparaumu instead.

On 10 January they attended a divine service was at the Wellington Cathedral of St Paul and rehearsed for the upcoming opening of Parliament.

On 11 January, in the morning, they attended a civic reception at Wellington Town Hall and visited the National War Memorial, where they laid a wreath. In the afternoon the two attended a state luncheon at Parliament House, toured the Ford car assembly plant in Lower Hutt as well as St James' Church. Later they attended a reception for the heads of diplomatic missions at Government House.

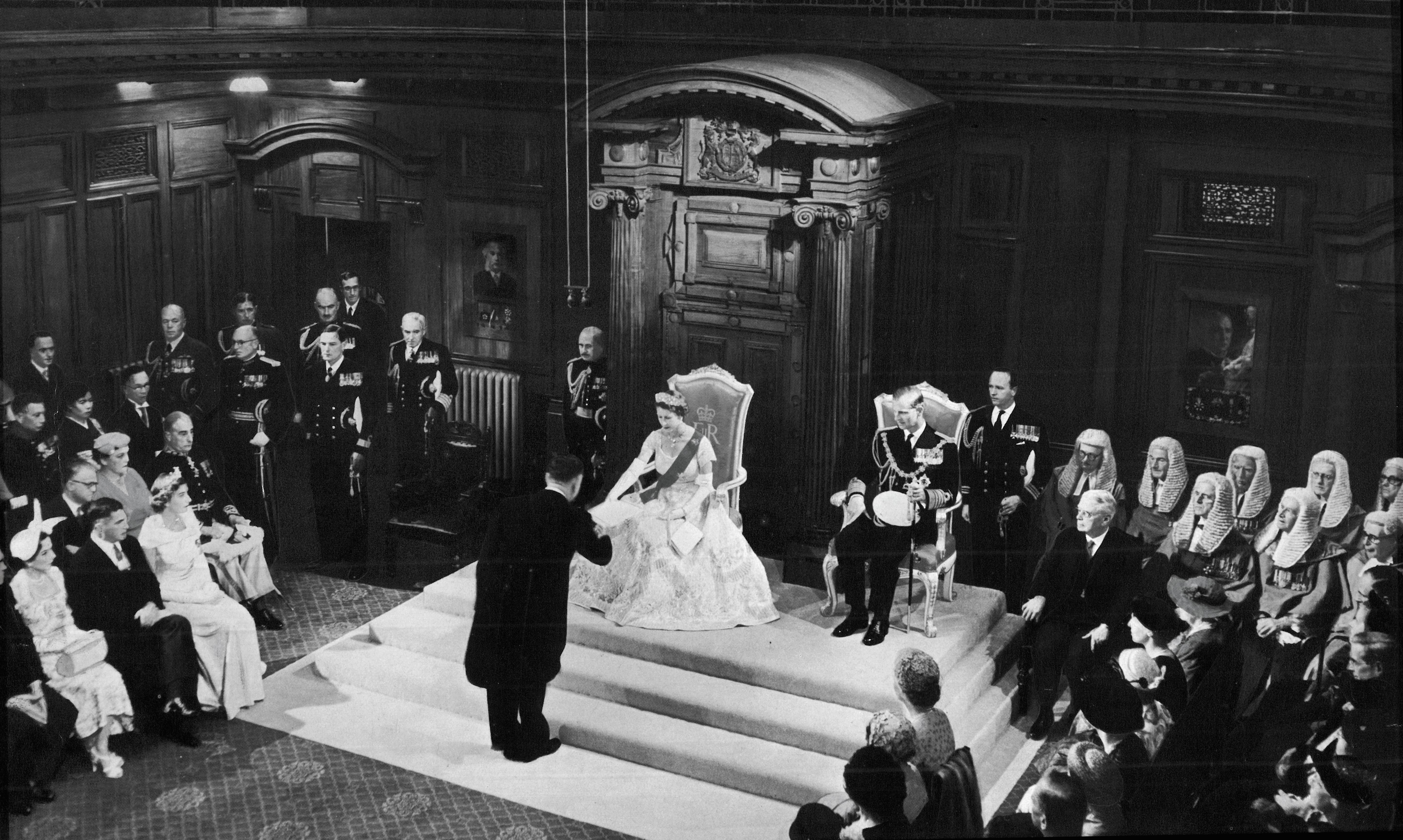
Opening of parliament

On 12 January they attended a children's gathering at Athletic Park, which had approximately 36,000 children and their parents. In the afternoon, the Queen opened a special session of Parliament, wearing her coronation gown, the Order of the Garter, a tiara and an ermine stole. The session lasted for only seven minutes, the shortest in New Zealand's history. The royal couple later attended a reception for members of Parliament and their wives at Parliament House and an investiture at Wellington Town Hall.

In the morning of 13 January, the Queen laid the foundation stone of the Wellington Cathedral of St Paul. She later attended a meeting of the Privy Council and Executive Council. In the afternoon, Prince Philip attended a luncheon with several scientific organisations.

On 14 January they spent the day at the Trentham Racecourse in Upper Hutt to watch the Wellington Cup.

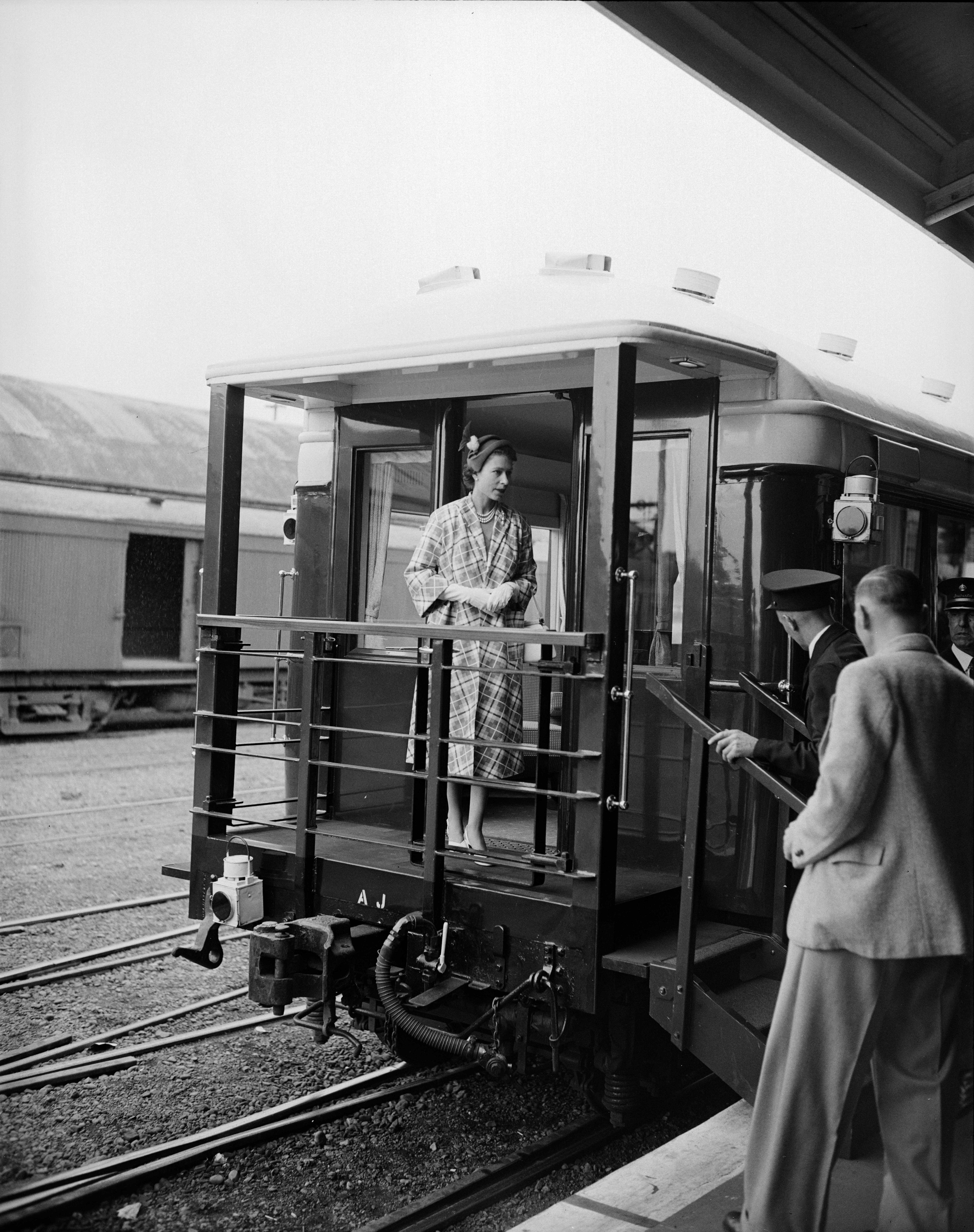
The Queen at Masterton

On 15 January the royal couple travelled by train to Masterton, where a civic reception was held, and by car to Wellington, through Carterton, Greytown, Featherston and Upper Hutt.

=== Marlborough, Nelson and the West Coast ===
In the morning of 16 January, the two travelled by car to Paraparaumu Airport, by aeroplane to RNZAF Base Woodbourne, in the northern South Island, and then by car to Blenheim, where a public welcoming was held. In the afternoon they travelled by car to Woodbourne and by aeroplane to Nelson, where a civic reception was held. Approximately 5,000 children gathered in Trafalgar Park to see the royals.

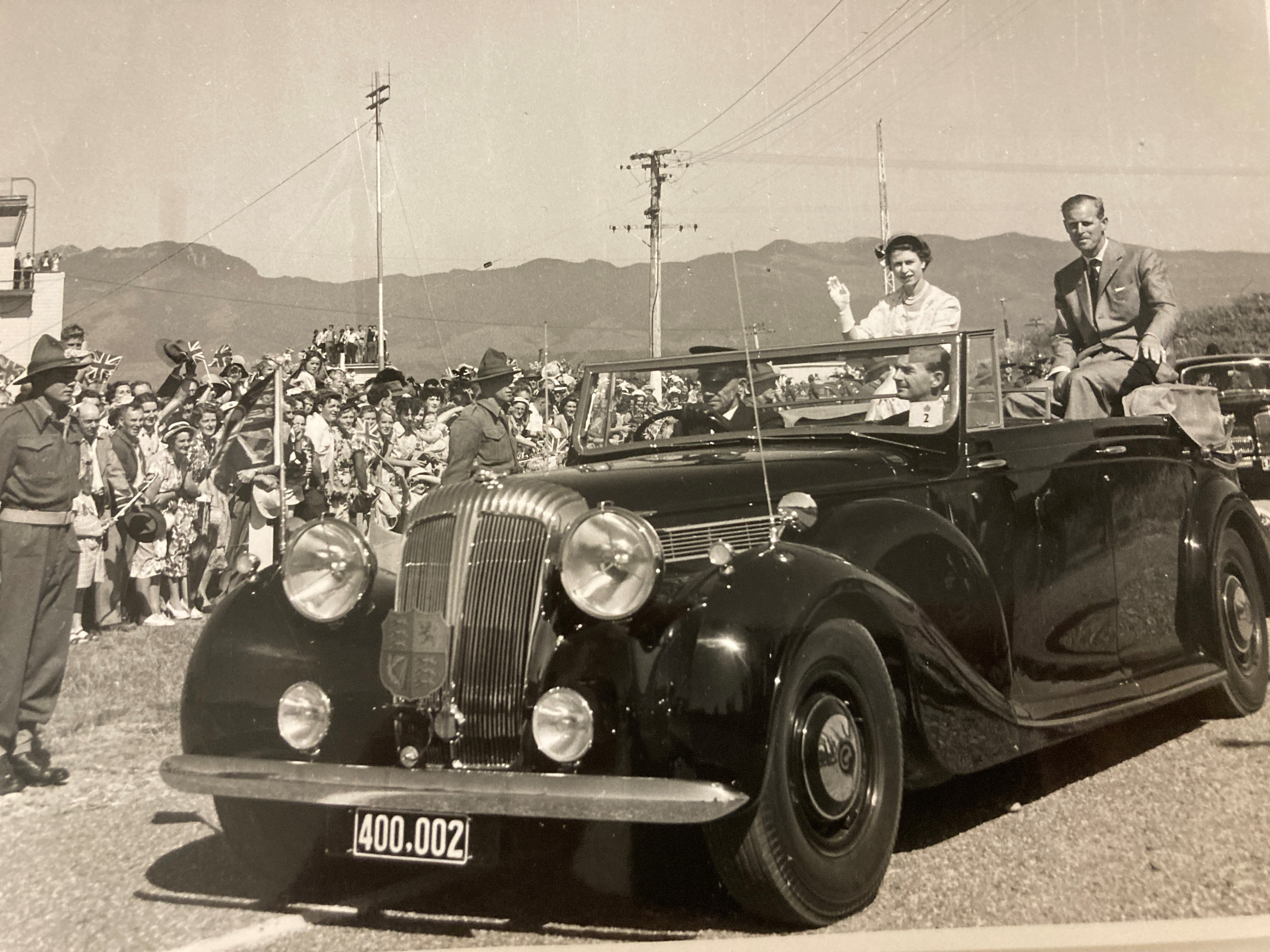
The Queen and Duke on a car in Westport

In the morning of 17 January the couple participated in a divine service at Christ Church Cathedral in Nelson. In the afternoon they travelled by aeroplane to Westport, where there was a public welcoming, and Hokitika. They then travelled by car to Greymouth.

=== Canterbury ===
In of 18 January the morning the two attended a civic reception in Greymouth and then travelled by train through Otira to Darfield, where they were given a public welcoming. They then travelled by train to Christchurch.

In the morning of 19 January the royal couple attended a civic reception at Christchurch's Cathedral Square and the royal couple visited Christchurch Hospital. In the afternoon they partook in a ceremonial drive and visited the Disabled Servicemen’s Vocational Training Centre. They also visited Christ Church Cathedral, where the Queen spoke; her address was watched by 1,200 people inside the building. Five thousand people listened to what was happening outside by a public address system.

In the morning of 20 January the royal couple toured the Lane Walker Rudkin clothing factory. In the afternoon Prince Philip spoke to and had a luncheon with the Canterbury Chamber of Commerce. The royal couple also attended an investiture at the Civic Theatre and a civic garden party.

On 21 January the royal couple went to the Addington Raceway.

On 22 January the two travelled by car to Burnham Military Camp as well as to Ashburton, where a public welcoming was held. They also travelled to Longbeach where they relaxed for the weekend (23–24 January).

On 23 January Prince Philip visited Winchmore Irrigation Research Station.

In the morning of 24 January the royal couple attended a divine service in Longbeach. In the morning of 25 January the Queen and Prince Philip travelled by car to Timaru, where a civic reception was held.

=== Otago ===
In the afternoon of 25 January they travelled by train to Oamaru and Palmerston, where a public welcoming was held at both places. They later travelled by train to Dunedin.

In the morning of 26 January the royal couple attended a civic reception at Dunedin Town Hall. In the afternoon they went to Carisbrook stadium to watch sport, along with 33,000 spectators. Yvette Williams achieved a record-breaking long jump of 6.25 metres (20 ft 6 in) but it was a foul.

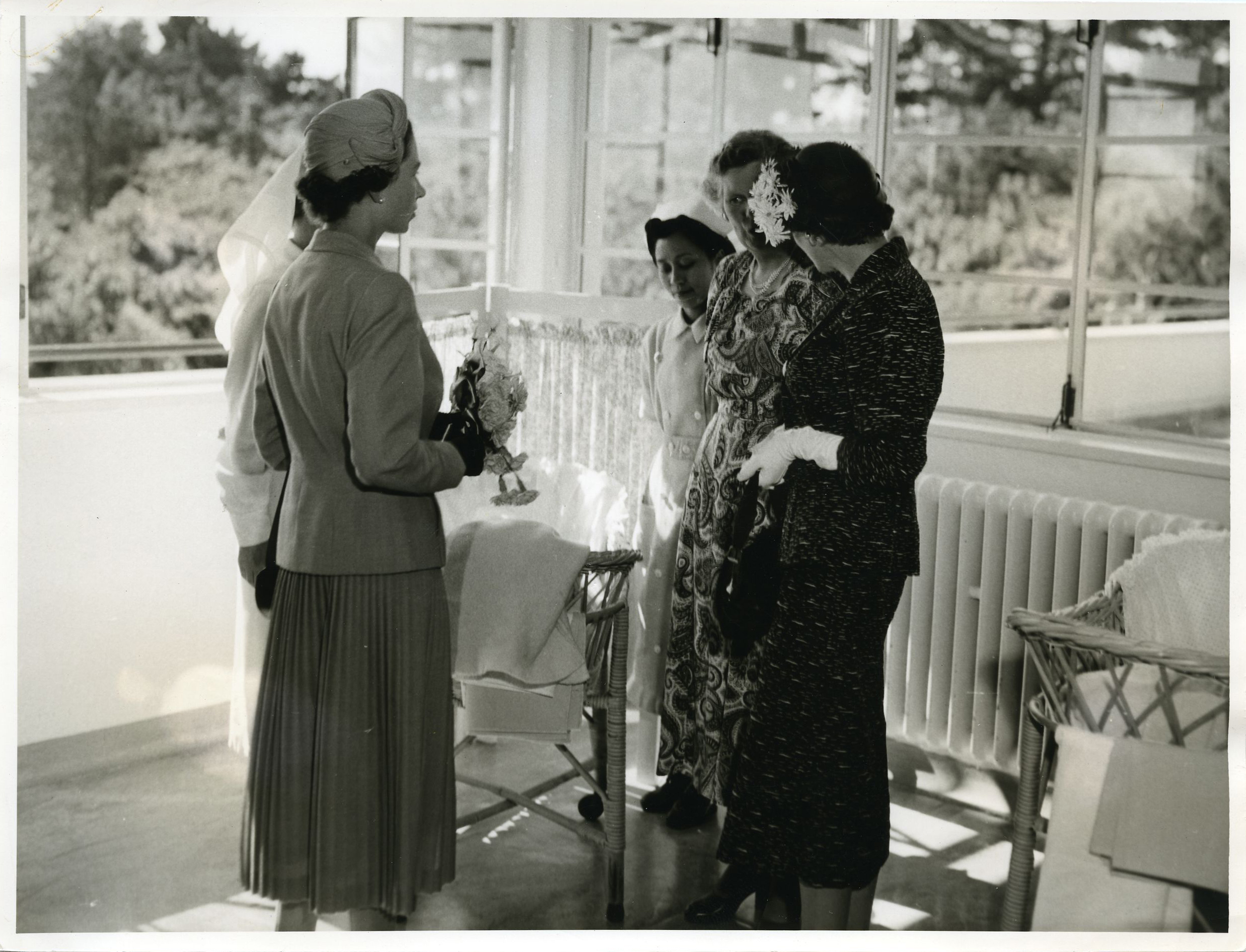
The Queen at Dunedin Karitane Hospital

In the morning of 27 January the Queen and Duke visited Ross and Glendinning’s Roslyn Woollen Mills. In the afternoon the Queen travelled to the Karitane hospital in Dunedin and Prince Philip met sportsmen including Colin Todd and Brian Wilkins, who were members of a Himalayan expedition. A reception was later held at an art gallery.

On 28 January the royal couple travelled by car to Milton and Balclutha. Public welcomings occurred at both of these places.

=== Southland ===
On 28 January the two travelled to Gore and Invercargill.

In the morning of 29 January the Queen and Duke attended a civic reception at Queens Park in Invercargill. In the afternoon they went to an agricultural show and a "Caledonian Sports Meeting". At night the Queen delivered a farewell speech that was broadcast throughout the country.

On 30 January the royal couple travelled to car to Bluff, where farewells were made. They then boarded SS Gothic to leave the country.

On 31 January SS Gothic visited Milford Sound. This was not part of the schedule.

== Statistics ==
The Queen and Duke visited 46 of the nation's towns or cities. According to the Ministry for Culture and Heritage, approximately three out of every four New Zealanders saw the royal couple on tour. Overall, the royal couple travelled over 2,000 kilometres (1,200 mi) by car, 1,200 km (750 mi) by aeroplane and 960 km (600 mi) by train.

This was the longest tour Elizabeth II ever made of New Zealand. In this tour she spent 39 days in the country. Throughout her life she spent a total of 147 days in New Zealand, across 10 visits.

== Commemoration ==
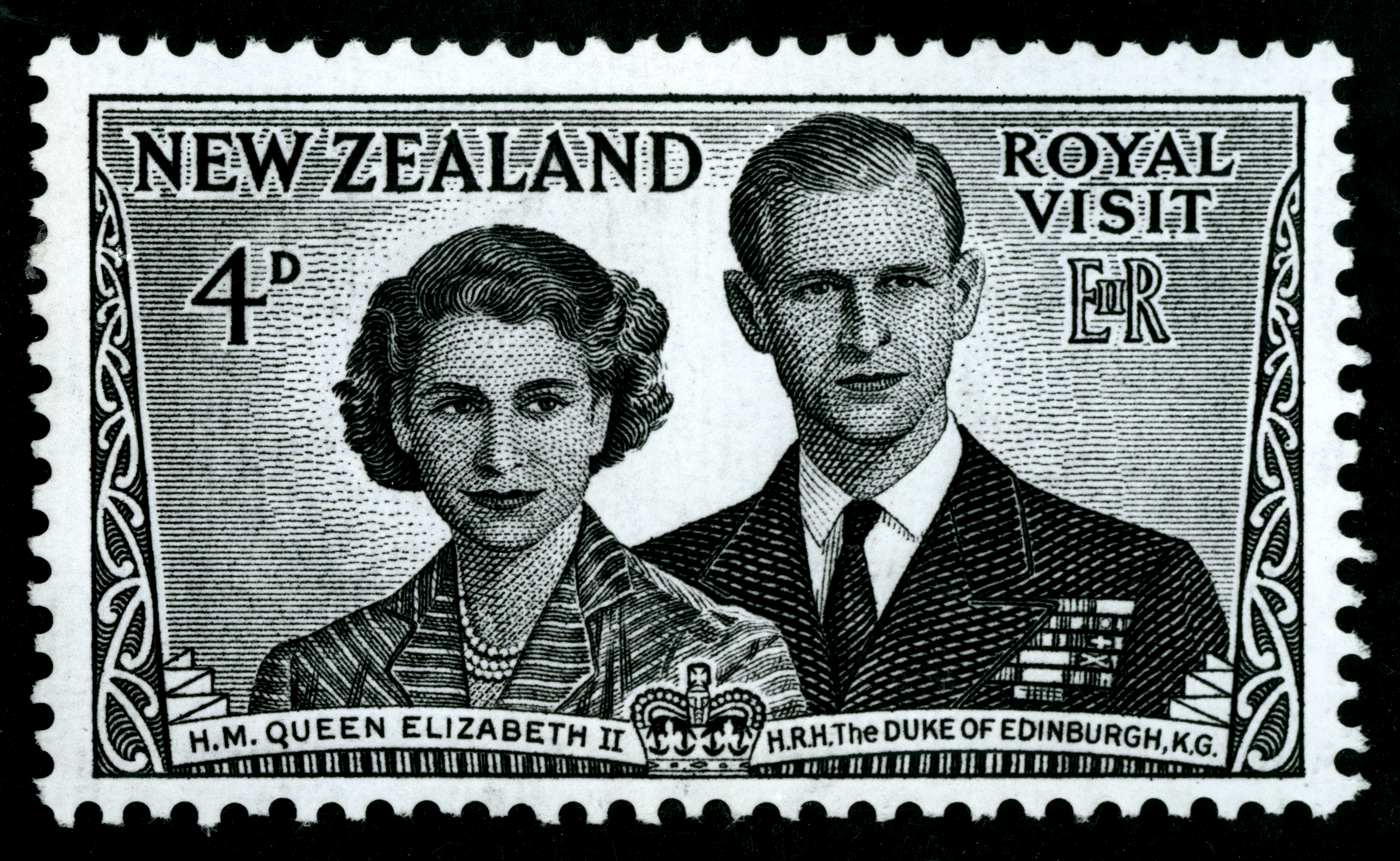
A postage stamp commemorating the tour

A medal commemorating the tour was given to 380,000 school children. On one side it says "ELIZABETH II ROYAL VISIT 1953–1954" with the New Zealand coat of arms. On the other side is a portrait of the Queen. All of the country's school children were also provided funding to travel by bus to see the royal couple.

Two postage stamps were made to commemorate the tour. One had both the Queen and the Duke and another had just the Queen.

The 1954 New Zealand Royal Visit Honours, appointments to the Royal Victorian Order and Royal Victorian Medal, were announced between 15 January and 29 January 1954.

== See also ==
- List of Commonwealth visits made by Elizabeth II
- List of state visits made by Elizabeth II
- Royal visits to New Zealand
