= Magic club =

Group of local magicians that meets regularly

A magic club is any group of local magicians who meet regularly. A club can be open to all with an interest in magic or it may be only possible to join by invite or by meeting some sort of notability criteria (e.g. professional magicians only). Some clubs may specialize in types of magic, or be primarily youth oriented.

Most magic clubs will charge a fee for membership. Fees will vary from club to club, depending on what services are offered.

== Magic clubs ==
- The Magic Castle, private clubhouse for the Academy of Magical Arts (Hollywood, USA)
- Magicopolis (Santa Monica, USA)
- Magic Club of Vienna (Austria)
- The Magic Circle, London-based society
- Pentacle Club (Cambridge)
- Portsmouth and District Magic Circle (England)
- Brotherhood of Auckland Magicians, New Zealand

=== Former magic clubs ===
- Future American Magical Entertainers, important New York club for teens from the 1940s to 1980's
- Magic Towne House, important New York club

=== Magic organizations ===
Although larger than local clubs, these allow amateur magicians to become members. Many local clubs are affiliated with these and require membership in one of them as a prerequisite.

- Academy of Magical Arts
- Australian Institute of Magic
- Australian Society of Magicians, it is the oldest Magical Society in the Southern Hemisphere and the fourth oldest in the world. (Australia)
- International Brotherhood of Magicians
- Society of American Magicians
- International Magicians Society
- Society of Young Magicians

== See also ==
- Magic convention
