= St James Theatre, Auckland =

Former theatre and cinema in Auckland, New Zealand

St James Theatre
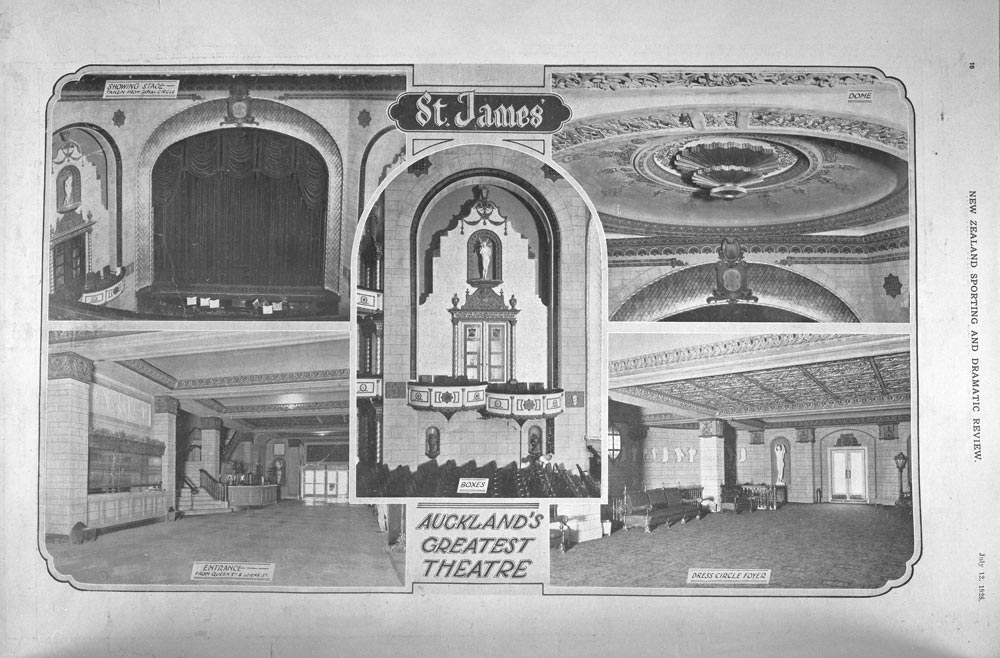
- Brochure of St James Theatre's opening

General information
- Type: Theatre
- Architectural style: Spanish Colonial
- Location: 314 Queen Street, Auckland
- Coordinates: 36.851273°S 174.764408°E
- Year built: 1928

Heritage New Zealand – Category 1
- Designated: 11 November 1988
- Reference no.: 4404

The St James Theatre is a historic stage theatre and cinema located on Queen Street in Auckland, New Zealand. Built in 1928 to a design by Henry Eli White, it replaced the older Fuller's Opera House and was originally designed for vaudeville acts. It shortly started showing films and up until the early 2000s was used for both live performances and film. St James Theatre was damaged following a blaze at the building in 2007. Since 2017 it has been closed. Restoration work was scheduled to begin in 2024.

St James Theatre is registered as a category 1 building with Heritage New Zealand.

== Description ==
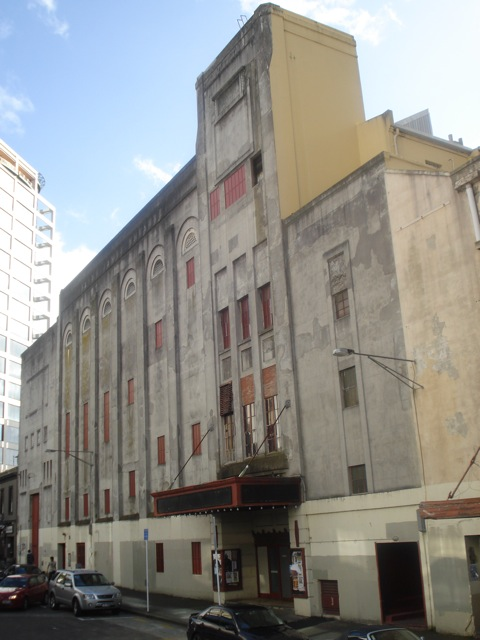
Rear exterior of St James Theatre

The interior of St James Theatre is a mixture of traditional theatre and American cinema design. The interior is in a Spanish Colonial style and has marble steps and statuettes. The interior has influences from both Victorian and Edwardian theatres and more modern American movie palaces. It has three tiers of seating. The theatre had an entrance on Queen Street with a large terrazzo foyer and an exit onto Lorne Street.

== History ==
St James Theatre was constructed in 1928 to replace the Wellesley Street Fullers' Opera House which had burnt down 2 years prior. It cost £80,000 to construct and took 9 months to complete. It was initially known as the 'New Opera House'. It was designed for vaudeville performances which were still popular at the time. In 1929 projection facilities were added and the theatre started to screen films alongside stage performances.

Norman Hayward became the manager of the theatre in 1935 and under his management the theatre won the contract for Metro-Goldwyn-Mayer in Auckland. In 1945 the theatre was purchased by Kerridge Theatres. Kerridge brought back live stage shows and hosted the Bolshoi Ballet Company, New Zealand Ballet Company, and Royal Variety Performance.

In 1953, the building's facade and vestibule underwent renovation for Queen Elizabeth and Prince Philip's visit to New Zealand. The monarchs were hosted at St James Theatre during their visit.

The Odeon Cinema, Westend Cinema, and Regent Theatre were added onto the building in 1957, 1966, and 1982 respectively. The Odeon cinema was the first public space in New Zealand to have full air conditioning.

In 2007 the theatre closed after a fire damaged the building. In 2010 St James Saviours was established as a group to lobby for the restoration of the theatre. In 2014 the ownership of the theatre was transferred to the Auckland Notable Properties Trust. The Trust has put $15 million towards the restoration and Auckland Council matched that in 2015–2016 and in 2023 the New Zealand government also contributed $15 million towards it. Restoration work was scheduled for the middle of 2024.
