= Brotherhood of Auckland Magicians =

Not-for-profit organisation in New Zealand

Brotherhood of Auckland Magicians Inc
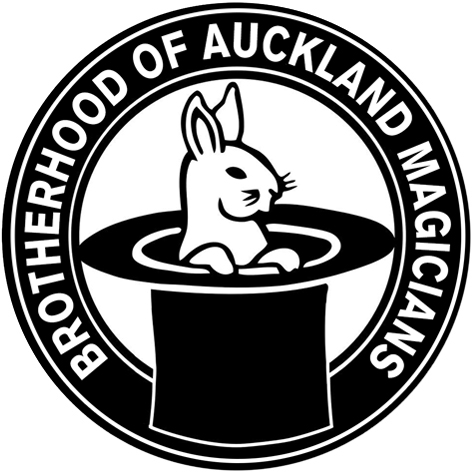
- Abbreviation: BAM
- Formation: 1946; 80 years ago
- Type: Not-for-profit society
- Website: http://www.bam.net.nz

The Brotherhood of Auckland Magicians Inc (BAM) is a New Zealand–based non-for-profit organisation and magic club. It was founded in 1946.

== Formation and history ==
The Brotherhood of Auckland Magicians (BAM) was founded in July 1946 in Grey Lynn, Auckland and was incorporated in 1979. The first president was John Mitchell.

Aims and objectives of the organisation as outlined in the constitution are to promote goodwill, mutual respect and cooperation amongst active performing magicians; to instil respect and loyalty for the personal inventions, specialties and routines of fellow magicians and to enhance professionalism in all areas of the business of magic.

The club presents an annual theatre show called the Magic Moments Family Comedy Magic Show and a charity show in October to celebrate international Houdini Day. These shows also support local charitable organisations.

Patron of the BAM is New Zealand show business journalist David Hartnell MNZM. The position was previously held by international magic superstar Paul Daniels.

Awarded for the top twelve minute performance, The Brotherhood of Auckland Magicians Cup has been competed for at national New Zealand magicians' conventions since 1956.

Published in 2021 to coincide with the anniversary year, the 210 page book Seventy-Five Years of Magical Excellence by magic historian Bernard Reid chronicles the entire history of the organisation. This combined the two previous works The First Twenty-Five Years by Ned Kelly and The Second Twenty-Five Years by Stanley Goudge along with new text from Bernard Reid to bring the narrative up to date.

== Grand Master of Magic Award ==
The Grand Master of Magic Award is a lifetime achievement award presented by the BAM on behalf of the magicians of New Zealand. It was first awarded in 1969 and to date it has been awarded on nineteen occasions.

== Honorary Members ==
Several notable international touring magicians attended BAM functions and were made honorary members of the society. These include John Calvert, Dai Vernon, Dick & Diana Zimmerman, Maurice Rooklyn, Virgil, Max Andrews, Vince Carmen and Edgar Benyon.
