= Hugh Carleton =

New Zealand politician (1810–1890)

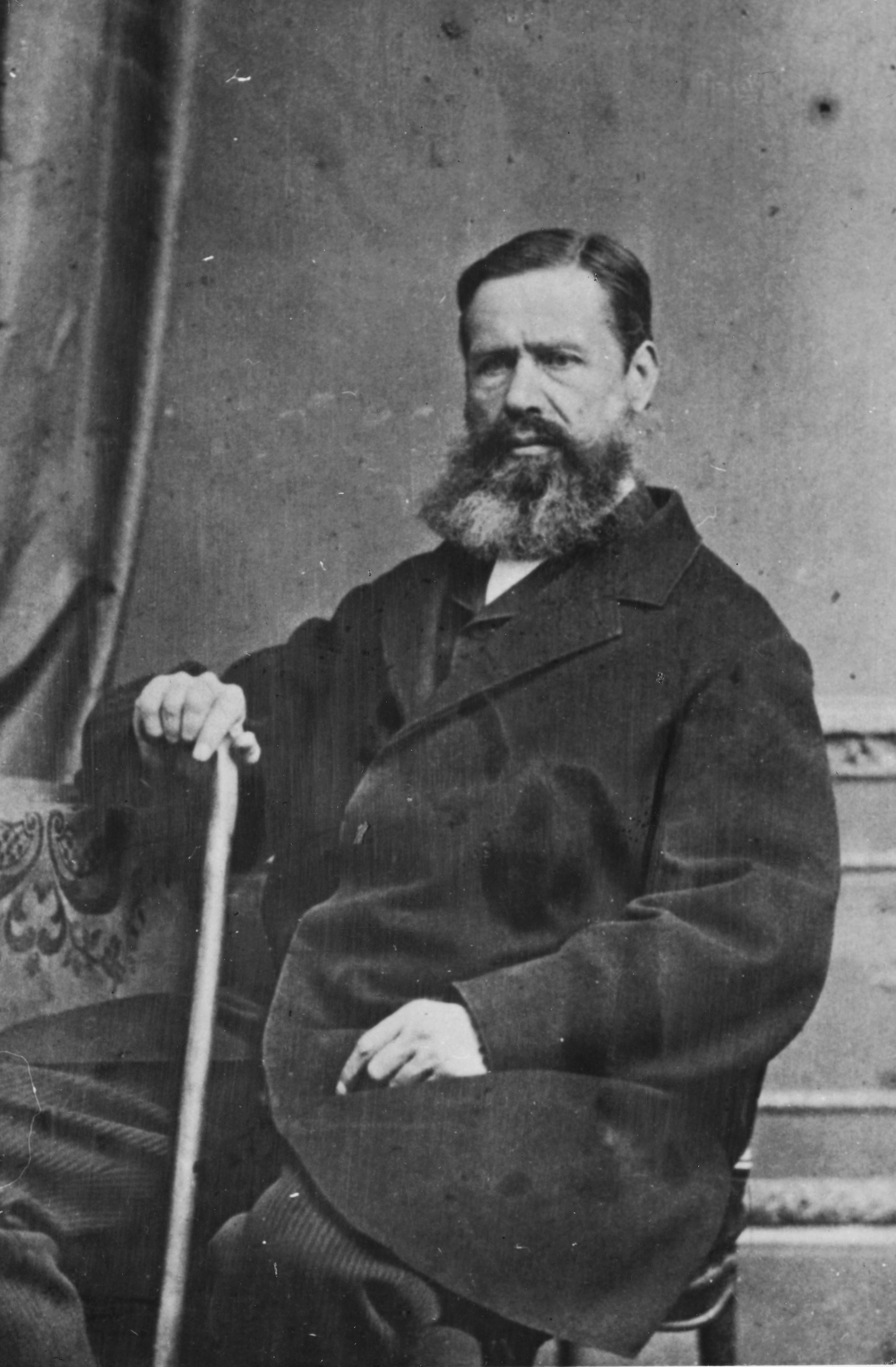
- Carleton, c. 1870s

2nd Chairman of Committees
- In office 1856–1870
- Preceded by: Frederick Merriman
- Succeeded by: Maurice O'Rorke

Member of the New Zealand Parliament for Bay of Islands
- In office 1853–1870
- Preceded by: New constituency
- Succeeded by: In abeyance (title next held by Richard Hobbs)

Personal details
- Born: Hugh Francis Carleton; 3 July 1810 Ireland
- Died: 14 July 1890 (aged 80) Lewisham, Surrey, England
- Spouse: Lydia Jane Williams (m. 1859)
- Relatives: Henry Williams (father-in-law); Hugh Carleton, 1st Viscount Carleton (great-uncle); Edward Marsh Williams (brother-in-law); Samuel Williams (brother-in-law); Henry Williams (brother-in-law); Thomas Coldham Williams (brother-in-law); John William Williams (brother-in-law)

Hugh Francis Carleton (3 July 1810 – 14 July 1890) was a New Zealand journalist and politician. He was New Zealand's first member of parliament.

== Early life ==
Carleton was born in 1810. He was the son of Francis Carleton (1780–1870) and Charlotte Margaretta Molyneux-Montgomerie (d. 1874). Hugh Carleton, 1st Viscount Carleton was the brother of his grandfather, John Carleton. His family was living in Clare, County Tipperary and then Greenfield, County Cork, Ireland. He was educated at Eton College and Trinity College, Cambridge. He studied law in London, then art in Italy.

== Life in New Zealand ==
Carleton settled in the Bay of Islands in 1842. On 30 November 1859, he married Lydia Jane Williams, youngest daughter of the missionary Henry Williams and Marianne Williams; they had no children.

=== Journalism career ===
Carleton became a journalist in Auckland and edited the New Zealander then established the Anglo-Maori Warder, which followed an editorial policy in opposition to Governor George Grey. In 1856 he became the editor of the Southern Cross.

=== Political career ===
New Zealand Parliament
Years	Term	Electorate	Party
1853–1855	1st	Bay of Islands	Independent
1855–1860	2nd	Bay of Islands	Independent
1861–1866	3rd	Bay of Islands	Independent
1866–1870	4th	Bay of Islands	Independent

Carleton was a member of New Zealand's first, second, third, and fourth Parliaments, representing the Bay of Islands electorate from 1853 to 1870, when he was defeated. Owing to the system of staggering used in the first general election, Carleton was actually the first MP ever elected in New Zealand (though he was elected unopposed), hence he liked to be called the Father of the House.

Carleton was the second Chairman of Committees, succeeding Frederick Merriman on 17 April 1856, i.e. just after the opening of the first session of the 2nd Parliament. He remained Chairman of Committees until he left Parliament in 1870.

He had a strong interest in parliamentary procedure, and unsuccessfully lobbied for the position of Speaker. He is known for his unsuccessful campaign against the availability of alcoholic beverages at Bellamy's, the parliamentary restaurant. He was also a critic of the idea that all voting districts should contain the same number of voters, saying that this system gave "a preponderating control" of the political world to one specific class. He was described as "scholarly" by his allies and "pedantic" by his critics.

== Later life in England ==
Carleton returned to England and spent the last ten years of his life there. He died at Lewisham, Surrey, England, on 14 July 1890. His wife, Lydia, died in Napier, New Zealand, on 28 November 1891.

== Publications ==
- Carleton, Hugh (1874) – The life of Henry Williams, Archdeacon of Waimate. Auckland NZ. Online available from Early New Zealand Books (ENZB).

== Notes ==
Political offices
Preceded by Frederick Merriman	Chairman of Committees of the House of Representatives; 1856–1870	Succeeded by Maurice O'Rorke
New Zealand Parliament
New constituency	Member of Parliament for Bay of Islands; 1853–1870	In abeyance Title next held by Richard Hobbs
