= Marianne Williams =

New Zealand educator (1793–1879)

Marianne Williams née Coldham
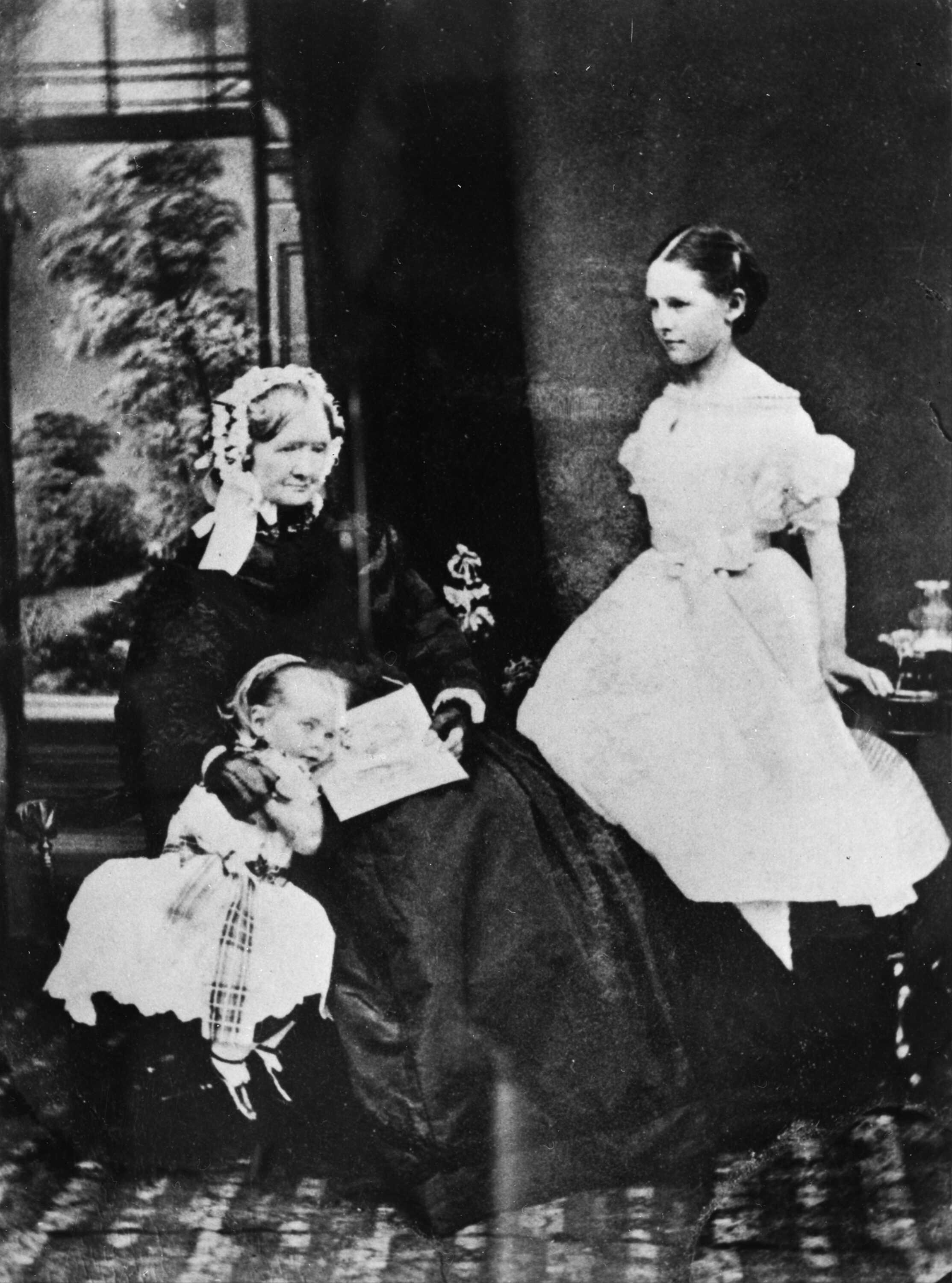
- Marianne Williams with her granddaughters Agnes (right) and Evelyn (bottom left), circa 1868
- Born: 12 December 1793; Norwich, England
- Died: 16 December 1879 (aged 86); Pakaraka, Bay of Islands, New Zealand
- Other name: Mata Wiremu (Mother Williams)
- Occupations: Missionary and pioneering educator
- Spouse: The Revd. Henry Williams
- Relatives: Edward Marsh Williams (son); Samuel Williams (son); Henry Williams (son); John William Williams (son)

Marianne Williams (1793-1879), together with her sister-in-law Jane Williams, was a pioneering educator in New Zealand. They established schools for Māori children and adults as well as educating the children of the Church Missionary Society (CMS) in the Bay of Islands, New Zealand. The Māori women called her Mata Wiremu (Mother Williams).

== Early life ==
Marianne Williams, née Marianne Coldham, was born in Yorkshire, England 12 December 1793. Marianne was the oldest child of Wright and Anne Coldham. Wright Coldham and Thomas Williams (Marianne's father-in-law) were hosiers in Nottingham, and both were Sheriffs. The family had moved to Nottingham from Norwich. Her father, Wright Coldham, was an active member of the Presbyterian High Pavement Chapel in Nottingham. Wright Coldham received recognition as a Burgess of Nottingham in 1796; as a Sheriff of Nottingham in 1798; and as the Mayor of Nottingham in 1809. In 1810 Anne Coldham died and at the age 16 Marianne took over raising her three sisters, Sarah, Maria and Anne, caring for her blind grandmother Mrs Temple, the running of the mayoral household, and acting as Lady Mayoress at civic events. In 1815 Wright Coldham died.

Marianne and Henry Williams were married on 20 January 1818 by Henry's cousin and brother-in-law, the Rev. Edward Marsh, a member of the Church Missionary Society.

Marianne and Henry shared a Christian faith and they joined the Church Missionary Society (CMS), with the decision eventually being made that Henry would become an ordained minister and CMS missionary in the Bay of Islands, New Zealand. In a letter to the Committee of the CMS of 6 August 1822, Henry said of Marianne: "she does not accompany me merely as my wife, but as a fellow-helper in the work".

== The early years in the Bay of Islands ==
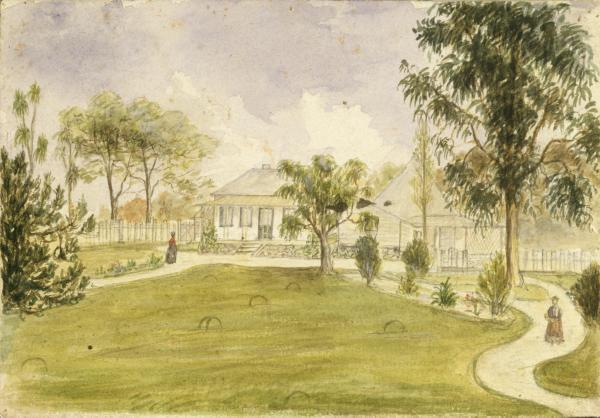
Watercolour painting by Henry Williams of the CMS mission house at Paihia

On 11 September 1822 Henry and Marianne and three children embarked on the Lord Sidmouth, a convict ship carrying women convicts to Port Jackson, New South Wales, Australia.

After a short stay with Rev. Samuel Marsden, he accompanied them on ship the Brampton from Sydney to the Bay of Islands, New Zealand where they arrived at Kerikeri on 7 August 1823.

The CMS had an established mission at Kerikeri where they stayed while Henry and other CMS members and built a store of plank and timber and a raupo hut on Paihia beach. On 15 September 1823, the family moved into the raupo hut, which Marianne described as having the appearance of a beehive. In 1830 a more substantial house was built using lath and plaster.

Chickens, ducks, goats and a horse were brought from Sydney. A garden was soon cultivated. Food was either cultivated or imported on the infrequent ships from Sydney. Pork and Kūmara could be traded from the Māori, however in the early days muskets were the item of barter which Māori wanted to trade, but Henry Williams refused to trade muskets. The supply of pork and other food was withheld in an attempt to pressure Henry to trade muskets for food.

== The protection of the mission by the chiefs of the Ngāpuhi ==
The members of the mission were under the protection of Hongi Hika, the rangatira (chief) and war leader of the Ngāpuhi iwi (tribe). The immediate protector of the Paihia mission was the chief Te Koki and his wife Ana Hamu, a woman of high rank and the owner of the land occupied by the mission at Paihia

In 1827 Hongi Hika lead the Ngāpuhi against the tribes at Whangaroa which caused anxiety amongst the missionaries as they feared they would be caught up in the fighting. The fears of the missionaries were increased when some of the warriors of Hongi Hika, acting contrary to his orders, plundered and burnt the Wesleyan mission at Whangaroa. During a skirmish Hongi Hika was shot in the chest by one of his warriors, which resulted in the missionaries fearing that they would suffer in the event that a muru occurred following his death (an attack launched out of respect for a deceased chief). On 6 March 1828 Hongi Hika spent his last moments "exhorting his followers to be valiant, and repel any force, however great, which might come against them - telling them this was all the utu, or satisfaction, that he desired".

The death of Tiki, a son of Pōmare I (also called Whetoi) and the subsequent death of Te Whareumu in 1828 threw the Hokianga into a state of uncertainty as the other Ngāpuhi chiefs debated what revenge was required. Henry was asked to mediate between the combatants. As the Ngāpuhi chiefs did not want to escalate the fighting, a peaceful resolution was achieved.

In 1830 there was a battle, at Kororareka (Russell), that is called the Girls' War, which also caused the missionaries to fear they would be caught up in the fighting.

While there were misunderstandings and arguments between the missionaries and the Ngāpuhi, the CMS mission was never threatened.

== The Paihia mission ==
The missionary work of Henry Williams and his attempts to act as peacemaker in intertribal conflicts meant that he spent months at a time travelling through the North Island of New Zealand. Marianne shared mission responsibilities with her sister-in-law, Jane Williams, together they cared for and educated their families. Together with Jane Williams, Marianne set up a boarding school for Māori girls; and provided classes to the children of CMS missionaries in the morning with schools for Māori children and adults in the afternoon. Schools were established in the communities inland from the Bay of Islands. Marianne trained and supervised the teachers, who included the wives of other CMS missionaries, her daughters, nieces or future daughters-in-law. In 1832 Marianne and Janes Williams, together with Mrs. Brown, Mrs. Fairburn, and Mrs. Puckey, continued in charge of the Native Girls' School, and of an Infant School at Paihia.

The domestic responsibilities of Marianne extended beyond her large family and included Māori and Pākehā visitors to the mission as well as providing assistance to other CMS members in Paihia, Kerikeri and Waimate North. Marianne and Henry had eleven children:

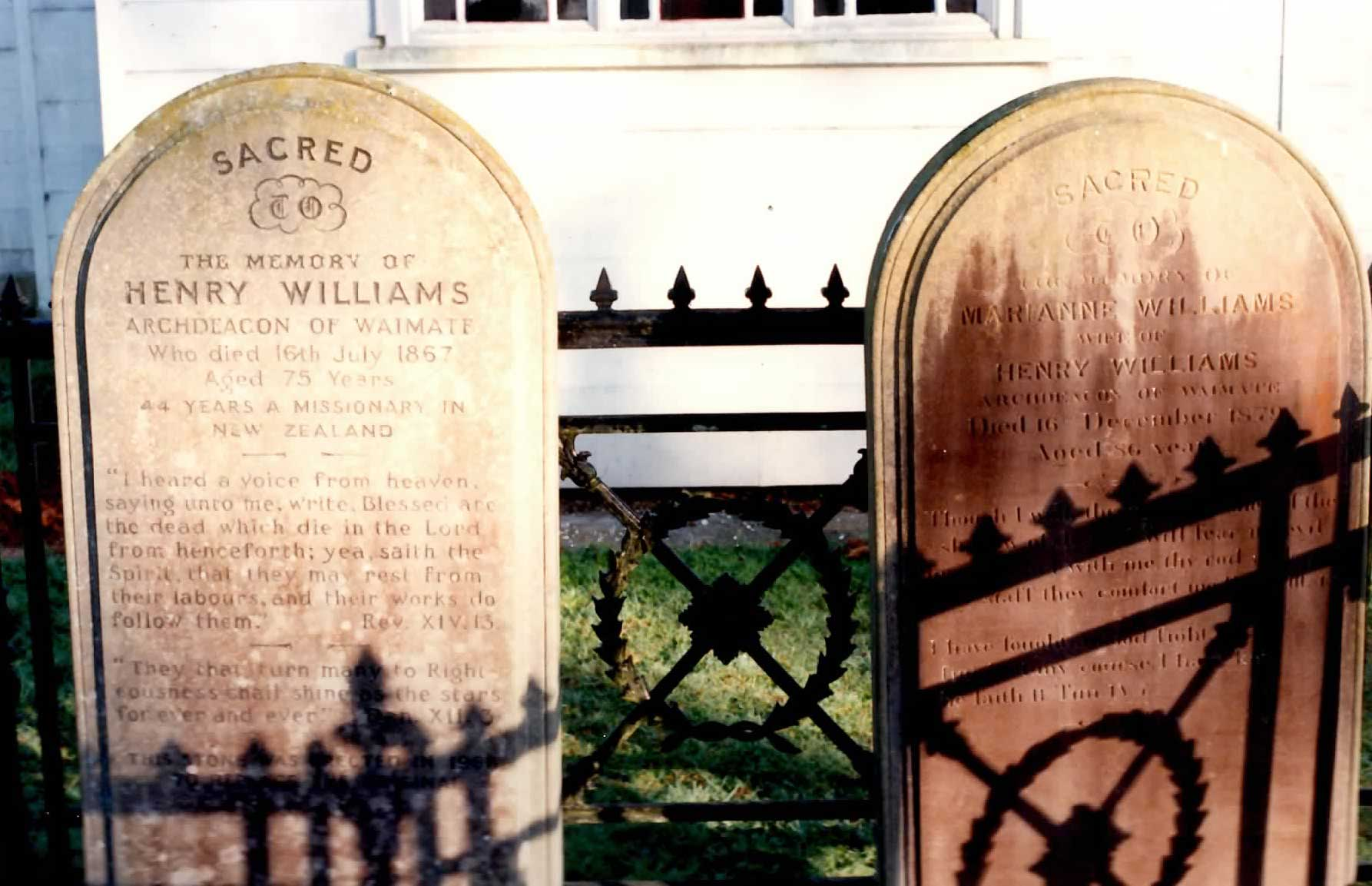
Gravestones of Henry and Marianne Williams, Holy Trinity Church, Pakaraka

- Edward Marsh (2 November 1818 – 11 October 1909). Married Jane Davis, daughter of CMS missionary the Revd Richard Davis.
- Marianne (28 April 1820 – 25 November 1919). Married CMS missionary the Revd Christopher Pearson Davies.
- Samuel (17 January 1822 – 14 March 1907). Married Mary Williams, daughter of William and Jane Williams.
- Henry (Harry) (10 November 1823 – 6 December 1907). Married Jane Elizabeth Williams (also a daughter of William and Jane).
- Thomas Coldham Williams (18 July 1825 – 19 May 1912). Married Annie Palmer Beetham, daughter of William Beetham.
- John William (6 April 1827 – 27 April 1904). Married Sarah Busby, daughter of James Busby.
- Sarah (26 February 1829 – 5 April 1866). Married Thomas Bidulph Hutton.
- Catherine (Kate) (24 February 1831 – 8 January 1902). Married the Revd Octavius Hadfield.
- Caroline Elizabeth (13 November 1832 – 20 January 1916). Married Samuel Blomfield Ludbrook.
- Lydia Jane (2 December 1834 – 28 November 1891). Married Hugh Carleton.
- Joseph Marsden (5 March 1837 – 30 March 1892).

== Life at Pakaraka ==
Henry and Marianne moved to Pakaraka when Henry refused to back down in an argument with Governor George Grey over the amount of land Henry had acquired so as to provide for his children. In this argument Bishop Selwyn took the side of Grey, and in 1849 the CMS decided to dismiss Henry from service. However, in 1854 Henry was reinstated to the CMS following representations to the CMS by Governor Grey, Bishop Selwyn and supporters of Henry Williams.

Henry and Marianne lived in the house known as The Retreat, that still stands at Pakaraka.

Marianne Williams died at Pakaraka, New Zealand, on 16 December 1879 and was buried in the grounds of the Holy Trinity Church at Pakaraka alongside the grave of Henry Williams.

== Literature and sources ==
- Rogers, Lawrence M., ed. (1961). The Early Journals of Henry Williams 1826 to 1840. Pegasus Press.
- Carleton, Hugh (1874) - The life of Henry Williams, Archdeacon of Waimate, Volume I. Auckland NZ. Online available from Early New Zealand Books (ENZB).
- Carleton, Hugh (1877) - The life of Henry Williams, Archdeacon of Waimate, Volume II. Auckland NZ. Online available from Early New Zealand Books (ENZB).
- Evans, Rex D. (compiler) (1992) Faith and farming Te huarahi ki te ora; The Legacy of Henry Williams and William Williams. Published by Evagean Publishing, 266 Shaw Road, Titirangi, Auckland NZ. ISBN 0-908951-16-7 (soft cover), ISBN 0-908951-17-5 (hard cover), ISBN 0-908951-18-3 (leather bound)
- Fitzgerald, Caroline (2004) Letters from the Bay of Islands, Sutton Publishing Limited, United Kingdom; ISBN 0-7509-3696-7 (Hardcover). Penguin Books, New Zealand, (Paperback) ISBN 0-14-301929-5
- Fitzgerald, Caroline (2011) Te Wiremu - Henry Williams: Early Years in the North, Huia Publishers, New Zealand ISBN 978-1-86969-439-5
- Gillies, Iain and John (1998) East Coast Pioneers. A Williams Family Portrait; A Legacy of Land, Love and Partnership. Published by The Gisborne Herald Co. Ltd, Gladstone Road, Gisborne NZ. ISBN 0-473-05118-4
- Mitcalfe, Barry (1963) Nine New Zealanders. Christchurch : Whitcombe and Tombs. The chapter 'Angry peacemaker: Henry Williams – A missionary's courage wins Maori converts' (p. 32 - 36)
- Rogers, Lawrence M., (1973) Te Wiremu: A Biography of Henry Williams, Pegasus Press
- Williams, William (1867) – Christianity among the New Zealanders. London. Online available from Archive.org.
- Williams, W. The Turanga journals, 1840–1850. Ed. F. Porter. Wellington, 1974 Online available from ENZB
- Woods, S. M. Marianne Williams, Christchurch, 1977

== Gallery ==
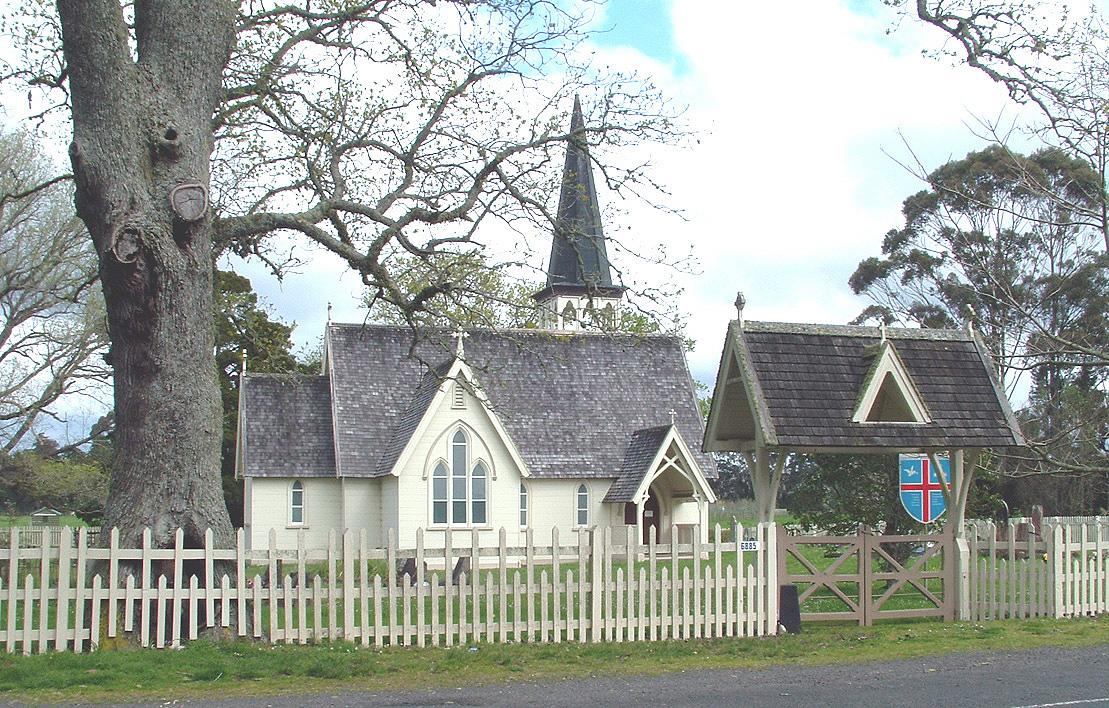
Holy Trinity Church at Pakaraka

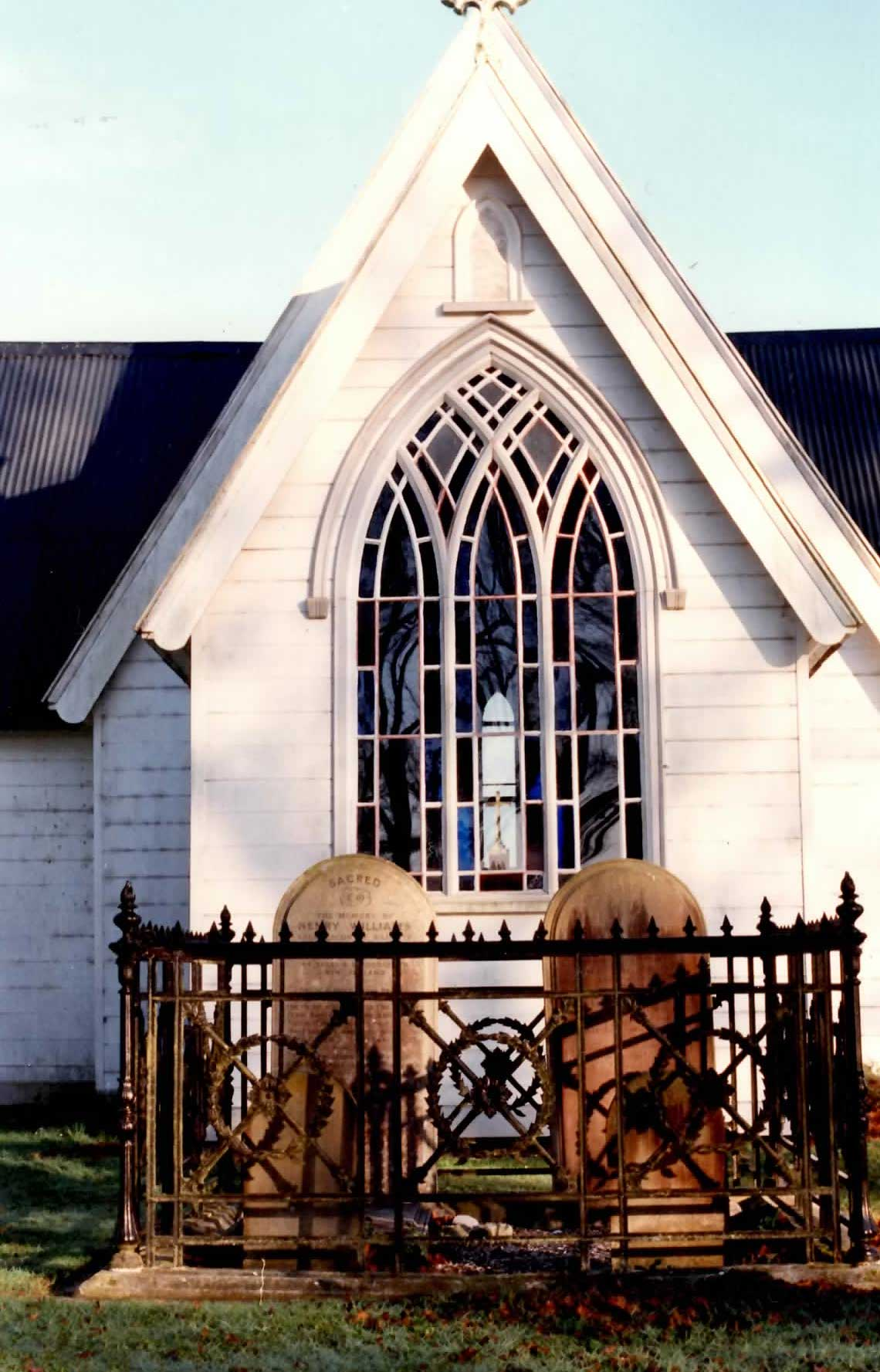
Gravestones of Henry and Marianne Williams, Holy Trinity Church

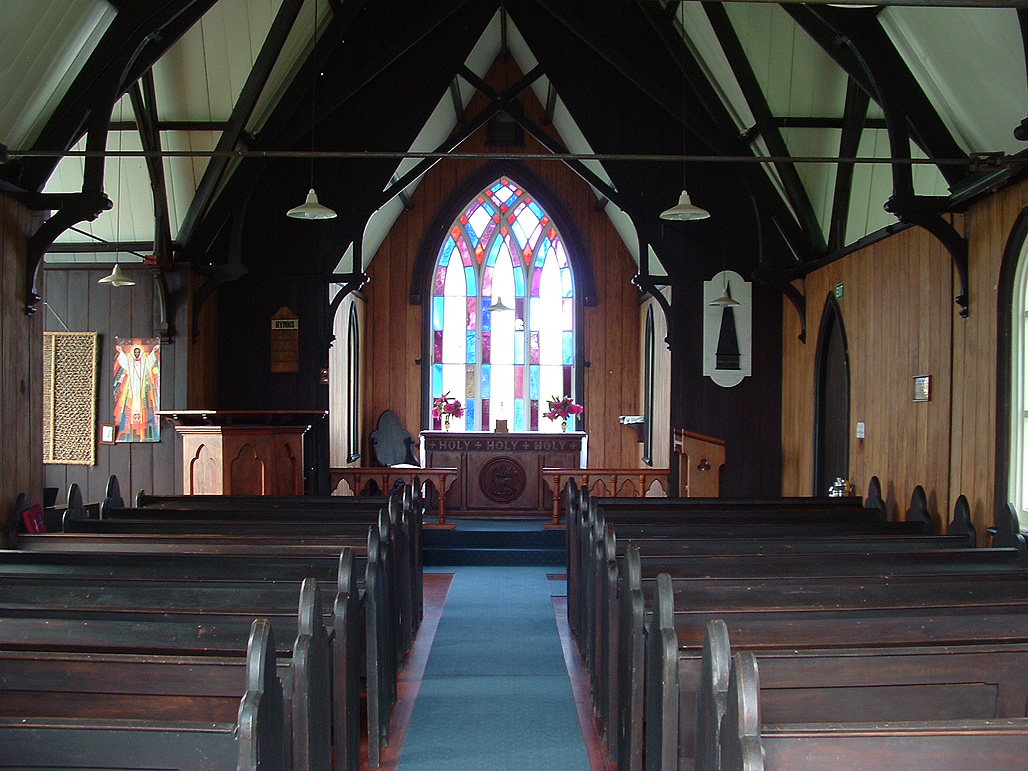
Interior of the Holy Trinity

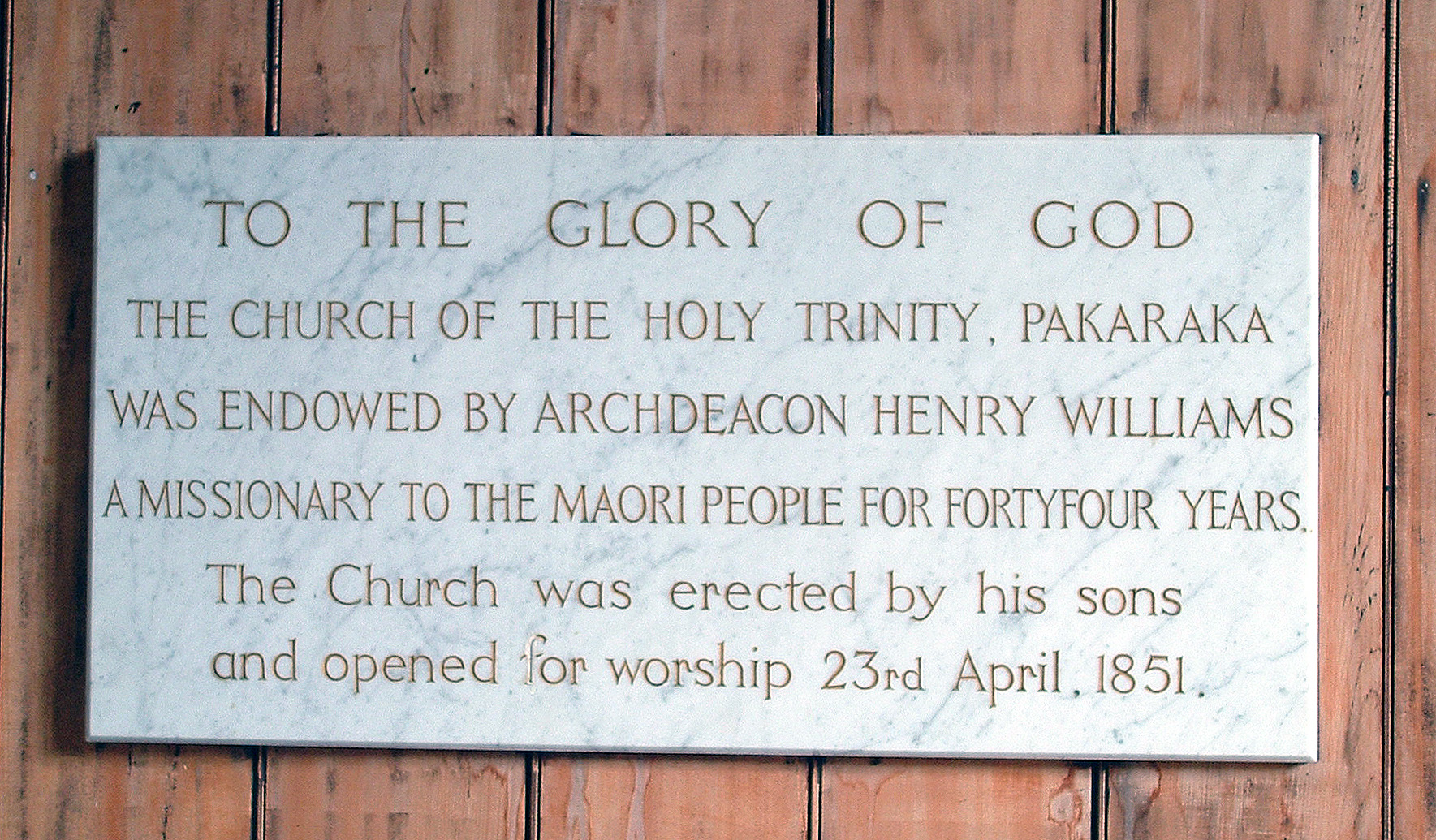
A plaque in the church

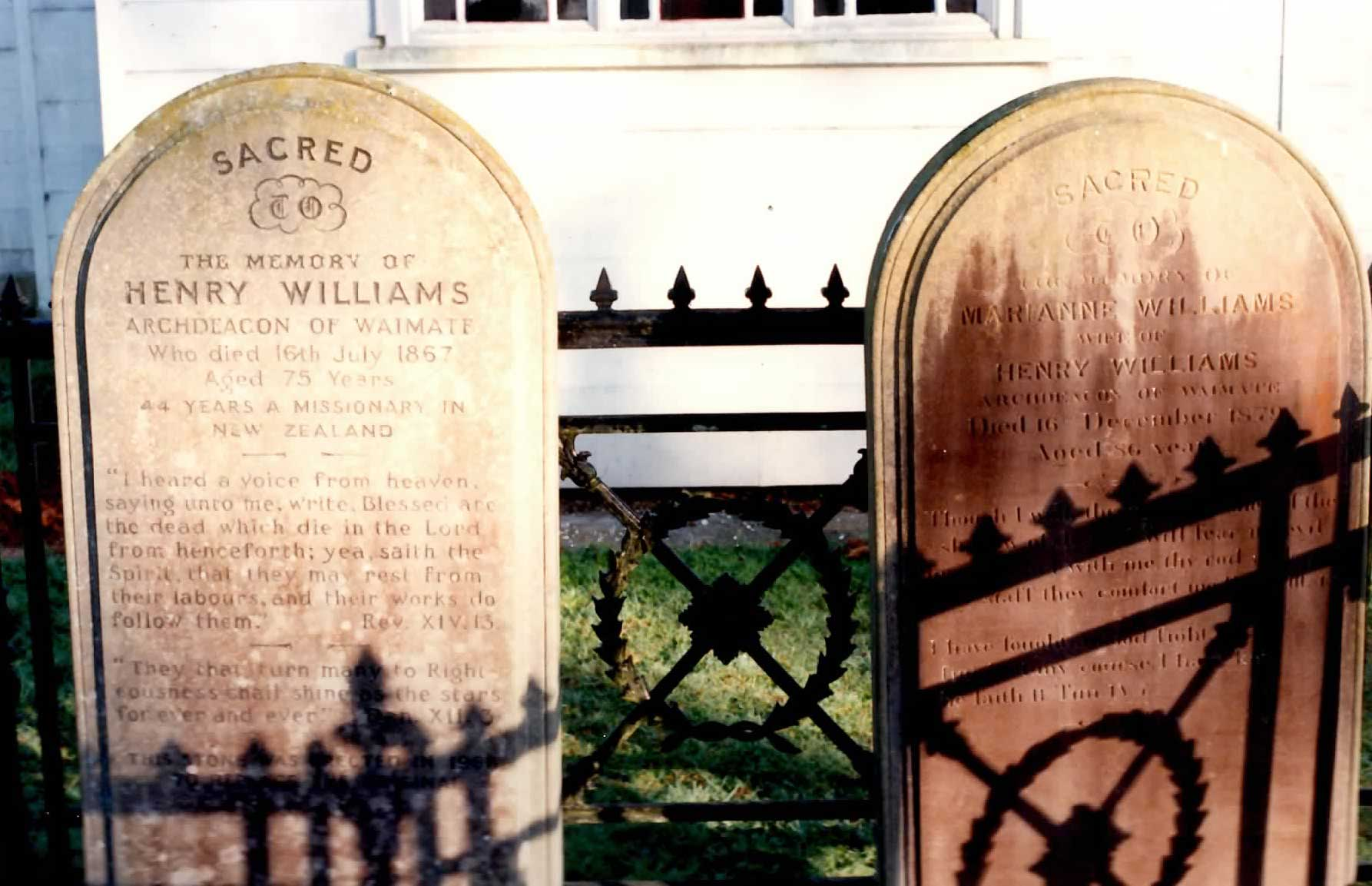
Gravestones of Henry and Marianne Williams
