= Lake Ōwhareiti =

- Location within Northland Region
- Location: Northland Region, North Island
- Coordinates: 35°23′13″S 173°56′34.5″E
- Type: Natural freshwater lake
- Basin countries: New Zealand
- Max. length: 2.07 km (1.29 mi)
- Max. width: 0.9 km (0.56 mi)
- Islands: Various islands and islets

Lake Ōwhareiti is a lake in the Northland Region of New Zealand, South of Pakaraka; it is 95.9 hectares in area and has a maximum depth of 16m.

== See also ==
- List of lakes in New Zealand
