= Edward Marsh Williams =

English missionary & judge (1818-1909)

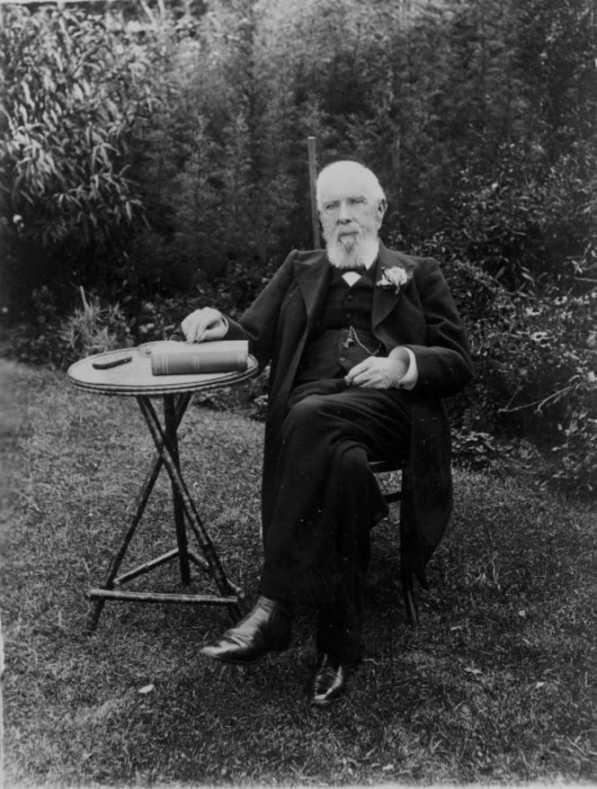

Native Land Court
- In office 29 April 1881 – 1891

Personal details
- Born: 2 November 1818 Hampstead, Middlesex, England
- Died: 11 October 1909 (aged 90) Te Aute, Hawkes Bay, New Zealand
- Spouse: Jane Davis
- Parents: Henry Williams (father); Marianne Williams (mother)

Edward Marsh Williams (2 November 1818 – 11 October 1909) was a missionary, interpreter, and judge who played a significant role in the British colonisation of New Zealand. He was born in Hampstead, Middlesex, the eldest son of Archdeacon Henry Williams and Marianne Williams.

At the age of 21 in 1840, when Captain William Hobson arrived in New Zealand, Edward — who had grown up among the Māori at Paihia, and as a result was fluent in Te Reo and understood Māori culture — helped his father translate the Treaty of Waitangi into Te Reo. Edward was appointed by Lieutenant Governor Hobson as government interpreter, Clerk to the Court, and the first postmaster at Auckland. Edward was appointed to judicial positions: as Resident Magistrate for the Bay of Islands and in 1881 Edward was appointed a judge of the Native Land Court (which became the Māori Land Court) of New Zealand.

Williams translated into Māori over 210 hymns and also The Pilgrim's Progress. In 1860, he translated God Save the Queen into Maori. He drew HMS Herald in Sylvan Cove, Stewart Island / Rakiura in 1840.

== Early life ==
Williams arrived with his parents at the Paihia, Bay of Islands, in July 1823 aboard the ship Brampton. He was educated in the CMS mission school by his mother and his aunt, Jane Williams, and by other members of the CMS mission.

In 1835, Williams returned to England on HMS Buffalo. He was apprenticed to a London doctor, but after twelve months he ended his studies as the consequence of brain fever (an uncertain diagnosis) and he returned to New Zealand.

== Translation of the Treaty of Waitangi ==
In 1840, when Captain William Hobson arrived in New Zealand he appointed Williams' father to take charge of the translation of the Treaty of Waitangi. As Williams was an experienced Māori linguist as well as being well-acquainted with Māori customs, he assisted his father to translate the treaty into the Māori language.

Williams was appointed as the Māori interpreter to Major Thomas Bunbury of the 80th Regiment, who had been appointed by Lieutenant Governor Hobson as Commissioner. On 29 April 1840 they travelled on HMS Herald under Captain Joseph Nias to take a copy of the Treaty of Waitangi (known as the "Herald-Bunbury" copy) to the South Island. On 16 June 1840 they arrived in Port Underwood in Cloudy Bay and obtained nine signatures. They then visited various Māori chiefs along the east coast of the South Island, stopping at Akaroa (two signatures), Otago Harbour (two signatures) and to Ruapuke Island in Foveaux Strait where they obtained a further three signatures.

The actual proclamation of sovereignty was made by Lieutenant Governor Hobson on 21 May 1840 (the North Island by treaty and the South by discovery), notwithstanding that his agents were collecting signatures for the Treaty in the South Island at this stage.

== Later life ==
On 20 April 1840, Williams defused a culture misunderstanding that could have resulted in conflict between the Ngāpuhi and the colonial troops. An early court case related to the murder of Patrick Rooney, a shepherd working at Pakaraka, by a Ngāpuhi known as Kihi, who was discovered and delivered up by other Ngāpuhi to the authorities at Kororāreka. Willoughby Shortland was in the act of a magisterial examination of the charge against Kihi when Te Haratua, a chief from Pakaraka, arrived with about three hundred armed warriors and began a haka. Shortland, believing the warriors had hostile intentions, sent for the troops. Williams, who was present as a witness, identified that Te Haratua and the warriors did not have any hostile intentions, having come over to make a public display of their abhorrence of the murder. He persuaded Te Haratua and the warriors to leave and explained in a quiet way that it was ignorance of Māori culture on Shorthand's part that made him call for the troops.

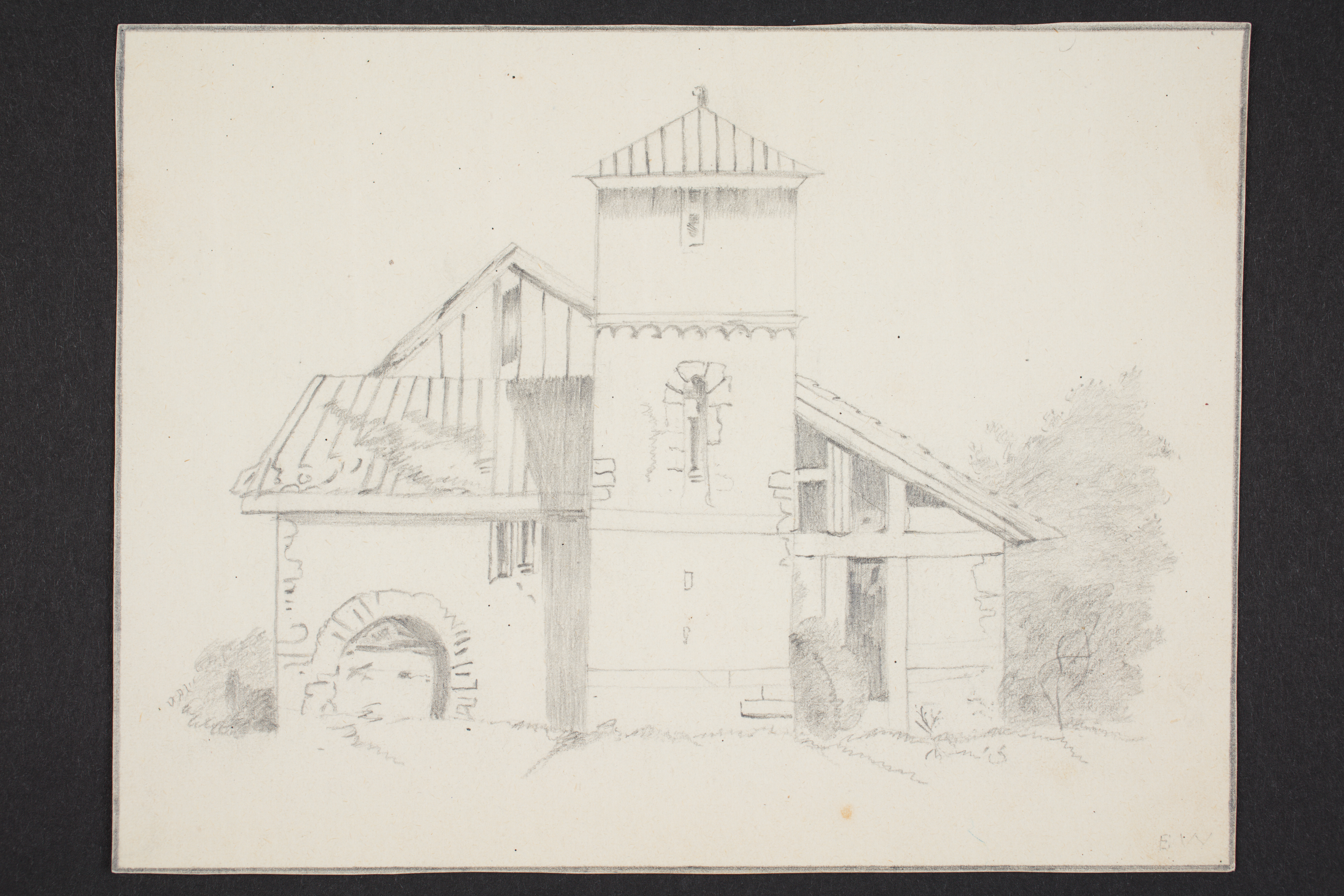
Drawing of a church by Edward Marsh Williams, now in the collection of the Auckland War Memorial Museum

Williams became a director of the New Zealand Banking Company, which was the first company formed in New Zealand and which was established on 1 September 1840 at Kororareka in the Bay of Islands with about £7,000 of capital. Williams was appointed by Hobson as government interpreter, clerk to the court and the first postmaster at Auckland He was with the first party of officials at the founding of Auckland on 18 September 1840, which had been designated as the capital of New Zealand. Edward held these positions until 1842, when he retired to manage the family property at Pakaraka. In February 1843, Williams married Jane Davis, daughter of Richard Davis who was a member of the CMS Mission. Williams and his wife taught at Te Waimate mission until 1846, then farmed at Awatona, near Pakaraka.

In 1861, Williams was appointed by Sir George Grey to be the resident magistrate for the Bay of Islands and Northern Districts. He held this position until 1880, when he was requested by the government of the day to retire upon his pension. He was appointed a judge of the Native Land Court on 29 April 1881. He retained office until 1891 when he finally retired into private life.

== Personal life and death ==
In 1843, Williams married Jane Davis (1822 – 3 October 1906), the daughter of the Revd Richard Davis. They had eight sons, including:

- The Revd Alfred Owen Williams, born 1856 in Waimate North
- The Revd Arthur Frederick Williams, born 1860 in Waimate North
- Joseph Heathcote Williams

Williams retired to Te Aute in Hawkes Bay, where his brother Samuel Williams had established Te Aute College as a school for Māori boys.

Williams died at Te Aute on 11 October 1909.
