= New Zealand Banking Company =

Former New Zealand Bank

The New Zealand Banking Company was the first bank established in New Zealand, it operated from 1840 until being wound up in 1845.

== History ==
The idea of a New Zealand-based bank was first raised in 1840s, and at a meeting in the Bay of Islands on 2 May 1840 the first offering of shares in New Zealand was launched.

The bank was established on 1 September 1840 at Kororāreka in the Bay of Islands with about £ 7,000 of capital. Half the shares were held in Sydney and the other half by residents on the Bay of Islands. The manager was Alex Kennedy and the first directors were Gilbert Mair, Edward Marsh Williams, Henry Thompson, James Reddy Clendon, Daniel Pollen, John Scott, William Mayhew, Philo Bebe Perry.

After the move of the seat of government to Auckland a branch was set up in Auckland in 1842. An attempt was also made to move the principal office to Auckland but this was unhappily ineffectual. The failure of the move decided the fate of the enterprise, and although it struggled on it finally succumbed in 1845. The bank was wound up and all liabilities to the public were paid, although the final capital was not returned to shareholders until 2 February 1850.

After the bank was wound up, there would be no New Zealand based bank until the founding of the ASB (formerly known as Auckland Savings Bank) in 1847.
