= John Marsh (composer) =

English composer (1752–1828)

John Marsh (31 May 1752 – 31 October 1828) was an English gentleman, composer, diarist and writer born in Netherseal, Derbyshire, England. A lawyer by training, he is known to have written more than 350 compositions, including at least 39 symphonies. While today known primarily for his music, he also had strong interest in other fields, including astronomy and philosophy, and wrote books about astronomy, music, religion, and geometry.

== Life and career ==
Marsh lived in Dorking, Gosport, Romsey, Salisbury and Canterbury before settling in Chichester in 1787 until his death in 1828. As a concert organizer, he was responsible for the music making in the towns and cities where he worked, especially in Chichester, where he led the subscription concerts for some 35 years.

Marsh was perhaps the most prolific English composer of his time. His own catalogue of compositions lists over 350 works, of which he lists 39 symphonies. Of these, only the nine that Marsh had printed are extant, together with three one-movement finales. His style owes much to Handel and Corelli and it is close to other composers of the time, such as William Boyce. Many of his works are also reminiscent of early Haydn symphonies.

Apart from the orchestral, ensemble, vocal and choral music, he also published many sets of organ voluntaries, totalling over 350 pieces, which are undated and, in which, quite unusually, he gives precise instructions for registration and dynamics. The preface to the first set of eighteen also contains a lesson to student organists on the various stops and their use. The fifth set of 44 also bears an informative preface on the correct use of voluntaries during the church service, and indeed how the organ was used in those churches fortunate enough to possess one. He wrote much for younger composers and players of the organ with copious advice on how to write for the instrument. In addition to church music, he recognised in the preface to his Overture and Six Pieces for the Organ that there was not much organ music being composed that was not destined for church services. In this particular volume he attempts to remedy that situation. Corelli was well known to him and he published a set of transcriptions of Corelli's concerti grossi for the organ.

During the twentieth century, his musical works lay in obscurity and he has only recently enjoyed a limited revival.

Marsh was a man of varied interests, and his 37 volumes of journals are among the most valuable sources of information on life and music in 18th-century England. They represent one of the most important musical and social documents of the period. They remained unpublished until the first volume appeared in 1998. In one passage, Marsh describes the great Handel Commemoration of 1784 in London.

Marsh's son was the poet and cleric Edward Garrard Marsh.

== Extant works ==
=== Orchestral ===
- The Salisbury Symphonies
  - Symphony No. 8 [9] in G major (1778)
    1. Allegro
    2. Andante
    3. Allegro
  - A Conversation Symphony for Two Orchestras [No. 10] in E♭ major (1778)
    1. Allegro maestoso
    2. Andante
    3. Allegretto
  - Symphony No. 2 [12] in B♭ major (1780)
    1. Allegro
    2. Largo 8 in a bar
    3. Allegro spirituoso
  - Symphony No. 1 [13] in B♭ major (1781)
    1. Allegro
    2. Andante
    3. Chasse: Allegro
- The Canterbury Symphonies
  - Symphony No. 5 [16] in E♭ major (1783)
    1. Largo staccato
    2. Allegro moderato
    3. Minuetto; Allegro spirituoso
  - Symphony No. 3 [17] in D major (1784)
    1. Allegro
    2. Andante
    3. Presto
- The Chichester Symphonies
  - Symphony No. 4 [19] in F major (1788)
    1. Allegro
    2. Larghetto
    3. Minuetto
    4. Allegro
  - Symphony No. 7 [24] in E♭ major (La Chasse) (1790)
    1. Andante (The hunter’s call in the morning)
    2. Allegretto (Setting out from home; the fox discovered)
    3. Allegro (Chasse)
  - Symphony No. 6 [27] in D major (1796)
    1. Largo maestoso; Allegro spiritoso
    2. Andante
    3. Minuetto: Allegro
    4. Allegro scherzando
- The Finales
  - Finale No. 3 in E♭ major (1799)
  Andante; Allegro
  - Finale No. 1 in D major (1800)
  Pomposo
  - Finale No. 2 in B♭ major (1801)
  Maestoso; Trio
  Allegro

=== Other instrumental / orchestral works ===
- 'A Quartetto ... composed in the Stile of Haydn's Opera Prima'
- Three Overtures (1828?)
- An Overture and Six Sonatinas for the Piano-Forte, with accompaniments for a Violin and a Violoncello

=== Organ works ===
- Five sets of Organ voluntaries (undated)
- Overture and Six Pieces for the Organ (undated)
- Transcriptions of works of Archangelo Corelli
- Editions of the works of Samuel Wesley and of G F Handel

=== Church music ===
- Psalm Chants published in part books (SATB)
- Anthem O Lord, who has taught us
- Six Anthems in Four Parts with a verse Sanctus and Kyrie eleison

=== Other works ===
- The Rudiments of Thorough-bass
- glees, songs
