= Henry Williams (New Zealand politician) =

New Zealand politician (1823–1907)

Henry Williams (10 November 1823 – 6 December 1907), farmer and politician, was the third son of the missionary Henry Williams and Marianne Williams. He was their first child who was born in New Zealand. He married his cousin, Jane Elizabeth Williams, the daughter of William Williams and his wife Jane.

He farmed at Pakaraka in the Bay of Islands. Williams was Chairman of the Bay of Islands County Council from 1876 to 1899.

Williams was a member of the New Zealand Legislative Council from 7 March 1882 to 27 June 1905, when he resigned.
