= Jane Williams (missionary) =

English educator (1801–1896)

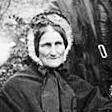
- Born: 1801? Nottingham, England
- Died: 6 October 1896; Napier, New Zealand
- Occupations: Missionary and educator
- Spouse: William Williams
- Parent(s): James Nelson and Anna Maria Dale

Jane Williams (née Nelson; c. 1801 – 6 October 1896) was a pioneering educator in New Zealand. Together with her sister-in-law Marianne Williams, she established schools for Māori children and adults. She also educated the children of the Church Missionary Society in the Bay of Islands, New Zealand.

== Early life ==
Jane was baptised in Nottingham on 29 April 1801. She was the daughter of James Nelson and his wife, Anna Maria Dale of Newark-on-Trent, Nottinghamshire.

In 1817 Jane became a teacher at the school for girls in Southwell, Nottinghamshire run by Mary Williams, mother of Henry and William Williams who were both members of the Church Missionary Society (CMS). In 1822 Henry Williams and his wife Marianne Williams sailed to New Zealand, to join the CMS mission in the Bay of Islands. William Williams intended to follow his brother after completing his training. On 11 July 1825, Jane married William Williams. On 12 August William and Jane embarked on Sir George Osborne to sail to Sydney, Australia, then on to Paihia, Bay of Islands, where they arrived on 25 March 1826.

Jane and her husband had nine children:

- Mary, born 12 April 1826; married Samuel Williams
- Jane Elizabeth, born 23 October 1827; married Henry (Harry) Williams
- William Leonard, born 22 July 1829; married Sarah Wanklyn.
- Thomas Sydney, born 9 February 1831
- James Nelson, born 22 August 1837; married Mary Beetham.
- Anna Maria, born 25 February 1839
- Lydia Catherine, born 7 April 1841
- Marianna, born 22 August 1843
- Emma Caroline, born 20 February 1846; married William Nelson.

== Paihia mission ==
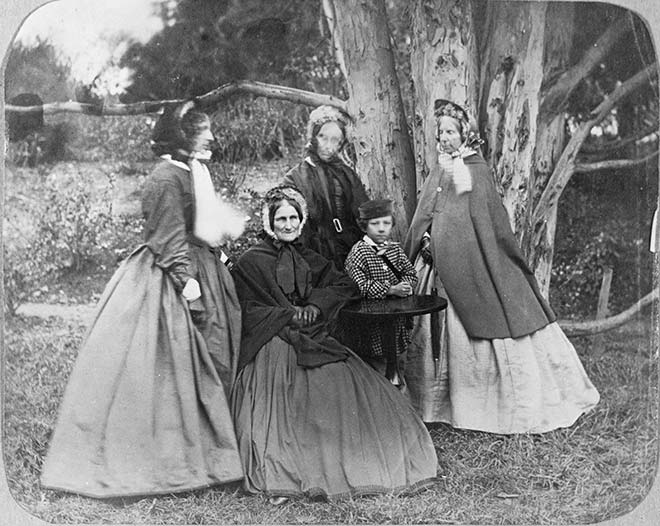
From left to right: Emily Harper, wife of Henry Harper; Sarah Selwyn, wife of Bishop George Selwyn; Caroline Harriet Abraham, wife of Bishop Charles Abraham and (seated) Jane Williams. The little boy is thought to be Caroline Abraham's son, Charlie

Jane Williams and her sister-in-law, Marianne Williams, shared mission responsibilities and together cared for and educated their families. They set up a boarding school for Māori girls in Paihia and provided classes to the children of CMS missionaries in the morning with schools for Māori children and adults in the afternoon. The teachers included the wives of other CMS missionaries, her daughters, nieces or future daughters-in-law. In 1832 Janes and Marianne Williams, together with Mrs. Brown, Mrs. Fairburn, and Mrs. Puckey, continued in charge of the Native Girls' School, and of an Infant School at Paihia.

== Waimate mission ==
In 1835 William and Jane moved to the Te Waimate mission where she conducted the school for girls and her husband conducted the school for boys in addition to his work on translating the Bible into Māori. On 23 and 24 December 1835 Charles Darwin visited while HMS Beagle spent 10 days in the Bay of Islands.

== Tūranga, Poverty Bay Mission ==
William and Jane and their family arrived at Turanga, Poverty Bay on 20 January 1840. Jane Williams ran the mission during her husband's frequent journeys conducting the work of the mission. They left Waerenga-a-Hika in Poverty Bay in 1865 when it was threatened by a band of Pai Mārire (Hauhau) and returned to Paihia for two years.

== Napier, Hawkes Bay Mission ==
Hawkes Bay was added to the Waiapu diocese and Archdeacon Williams, Jane Williams and their daughters moved to Napier in May 1867. William Williams was consecrated as the Bishop of Waiapu on 3 April 1859 at the meeting of the General Synod at Wellington. Jane and three of her daughters were involved in establishing a school for Māori girls, which became Hukarere Girls' College that opened in July 1875 on Hukarere Road, Napier. Anna Maria Williams, known as 'Miss Maria', as the superintendent of the school, kept the accounts, managed the correspondence and taught English and the Scriptures. She was assisted by her sisters, Lydia Catherine ('Miss Kate') and Marianne ('Miss Mary Anne').

== Death ==
Jane Williams died on 6 October 1896 in Napier. Her obituary said: "The treasure William Williams brought to these shores was that bright, intelligent, courageous and cheerful soul."

== Sources ==
- Evans, Rex D. (compiler) (1992) – Faith and farming Te huarahi ki te ora: The Legacy of Henry Williams and William Williams. Published by Evagean Publishing, Titirangi, Auckland NZ. ISBN 0-908951-16-7 (soft cover), ISBN 0-908951-17-5 (hard cover), ISBN 0-908951-18-3 (leather bound)
- Fitzgerald, Caroline (2004) - Letters from the Bay of Islands. Sutton Publishing Limited, United Kingdom; ISBN 0-7509-3696-7 (Hardcover). Penguin Books, New Zealand, (Paperback) ISBN 0-14-301929-5
- Gillies, Iain and John (1998) – East Coast Pioneers. A Williams Family Portrait: A Legacy of Land, Love and Partnership. Published by The Gisborne Herald Co. Ltd, Gisborne NZ. ISBN 0-473-05118-4
- Williams, William (1867) – Christianity among the New Zealanders. London. Online available from Archive.org.
- Williams, W. The Turanga journals, 1840–1850. Ed. F. Porter. Wellington, 1974 Online available from ENZB
