= Samuel Williams (missionary) =

English missionary (1822–1907)

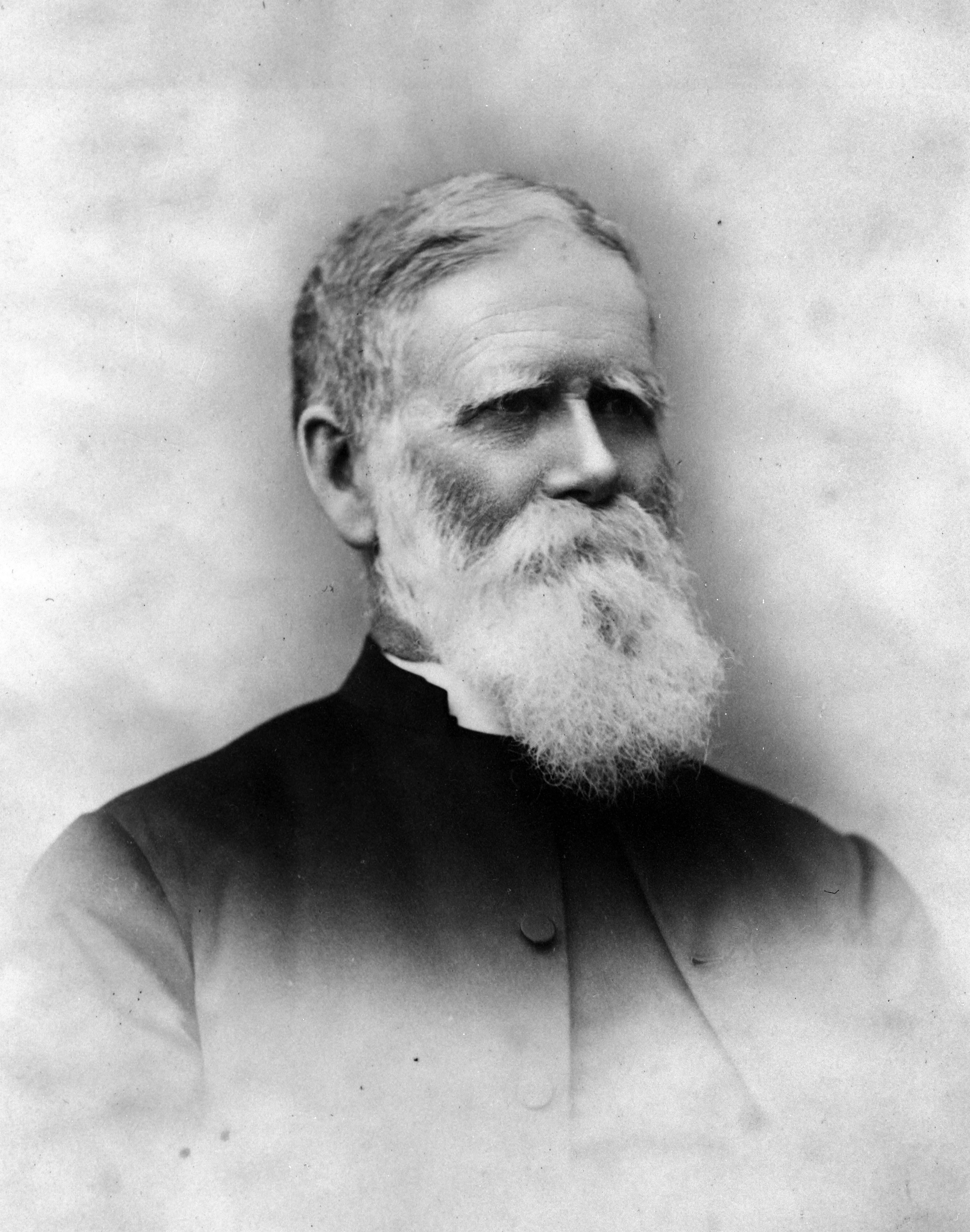
Samuel Williams in 1880

Samuel Williams (17 January 1822 – 14 March 1907) was a New Zealand missionary, educationalist, farmer and pastoralist.

== Early life ==
Williams was born in Cheltenham, Gloucestershire, England, and came to New Zealand as a young child. His parents were Marianne Williams and her husband, the missionary Henry Williams. He received his education from his uncle, William Williams.

In 1841 Williams was managing the family farm at Pakaraka. He was managing the farm during the Flagstaff War when in June 1845 Hone Heke went to Pakaraka to gather food supplies. (Note: Letter of Archdeacon Henry Williams to the Reverend E. G. Marsh. 18 April 1845 (p 115); Letter Mrs. Williams to Mrs. Heathcote, 5 & 8 July 1845 (p. 116) describe Heke's warriors eating the potatoes and other stores at the farm at Pakaraka.)

== Missionary work ==
From April 1844 to 1846, he attended the College of St. John Evangelist, when it was located at Te Waimate mission and then at St John's College in Auckland. On 30 September 1846, Williams married Mary Williams, daughter of William and Jane Williams and thus his first cousin. He was also ordained at St John’s College in Auckland in 1846. On 20 September 1846 he was appointed deacon of Old St. Pauls, Auckland.

From February 1848 to December 1853 Williams assisted Archdeacon Octavius Hadfield at Otaki. In 1853, after William Colenso was dismissed from the Church Missionary Society (CMS), Williams was persuaded to move to Hawkes Bay.

Williams withdrew from the CMS and worked with his uncle and father-in-law, the Revd William Williams, to establish the Te Aute estate as a school for Māori boys. Te Aute College opened in 1854. However the school buildings were destroyed in a fire. Williams worked the Te Aute estate in order to provide the financial resources to rebuild the school. His aunt Catherine Heathcote assisted with financial support and in 1870 he had accumulated £700; building began in 1871 and was completed in 1872. Williams was gifted £700 from his aunt Catherine Heathcote to build a school for Māori girls. The school that became Hukarere Girls' College was opened in 1875.

In 1859 Williams built Christ Church at Pukehou, nearby to Te Aute.

Williams was the Rural Dean of Hawke's Bay from 1854 to 1888. He was archdeacon in 1888 and in 1889 was appointed the archdeacon and canon of St John's Cathedral, Napier while still continuing his work at Te Aute College.

== Death ==
Williams died in Te Aute on 14 March 1907.
