= Ana Hamu =

Ana Hamu was a Māori woman of the Ngāpuhi iwi (tribe) in northern New Zealand. She was a woman of high rank. Hamu was closely related to Eruera Maihi Patuone.

Hamu was baptised on 5 October 1834 by the Revd. Henry Williams and adopted the name Ana.

Hamu was the widow of Te Koki, a chief of Te Uri-o-Ngongo Hapū. They had at least two children together, Te Ahara and Rangituke. She later became the wife of the chief Pukututu.

Te Koki and Hamu gave the Church Missionary Society (CMS) permission to occupy land at Paihia.

Hamu gave her signature to the Treaty of Waitangi on 6 February 1840, and was one of only a few women to sign the treaty.

She was connected with the CMS Girls' School in Paihia, where she kept the Māori children within bounds by her presence.

She was believed to be approximately 60 years old when she died in 1848.
