= Edward Garrard Marsh =

English poet and Anglican clergyman

Edward Garrard Marsh (1783–1862) was an English poet and Anglican clergyman.

== Life ==
He was son of the composer John Marsh. He was a good friend of William Hayley, and associated with him and William Blake.

Marsh studied at Wadham College, Oxford, and on graduating became a Fellow of Oriel College, Oxford. He was a curate at Nuneham, and then bought a chapel in Hampstead. He became Residentiary Canon at Southwell. He was vicar of Sandon, Hertfordshire and then Aylesford, Kent. He was Bampton Lecturer in 1848.

At 7 July 1813 Marsh married Lydia Williams (Gosport, England, 17 January 1788 - 13 December 1859) at Southwell, England. She was a sister of Rev. Henry Williams and Rev. William Williams. Their grandfather Rev. Thomas Williams was a Congregational minister.

While he had connections to non-conformist family members, Marsh's beliefs followed that of low church evangelical Anglicanism. He was also from 1821 a prebendary of Woodborough, Nottinghamshire, an office suppressed in 1841 by the Church Commissioners. In 1836 he was the vicar of Aylesford, Kent.

He was a member of the Church Missionary Society (CMS) and was described as 'influential' in the decision of Henry Williams and William Williams to convert to Anglicanism in February 1818, and then to join the CMS.

The South Africa and Patagonia missionary Allen Francis Gardiner's second wife, Elizabeth Lydia, was Marsh's daughter.

== Works ==
- The Book of Psalms translated into English Verse (1832)
- Two Hundred and Ten Psalms and Hymns, arranged in three series (1837)
- Account of the Slavery of Friends in the Barbary States, towards the close of the seventeenth century (1848, primarily a selection from the letters of George Fox)
- The Christian Doctrine of Sanctification : considered in eight sermons preached before the University of Oxford as the Bampton Lecture for the year 1848 (1848)

== Literature ==
- Robert N. Essick, "Blake, Hayley, and Edward Garrard Marsh: 'An Insect of Parnassus.'" Explorations: The Age of Enlightenment. Special Series 1 (1987): 58-84.
- Ed. Brian Robins, "The John Marsh Journals: The Life and Times of Gentleman Composer (1752-1828)", Stuyvesant, NJ (1998 and 2011)
