= Pakaraka =

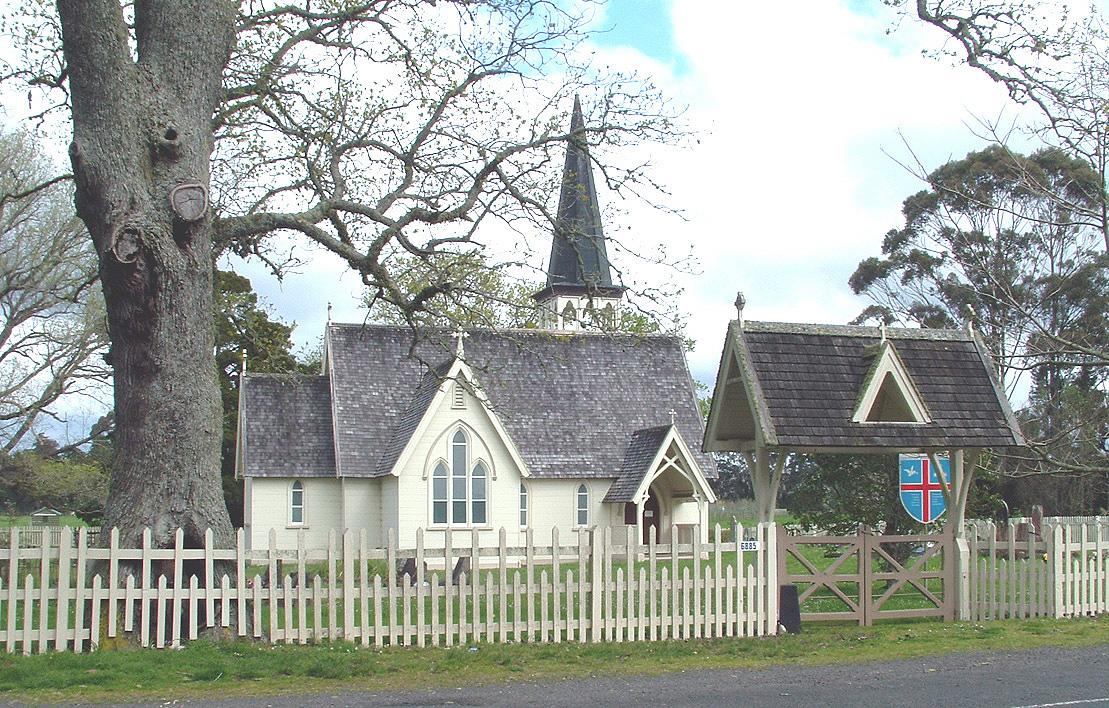
- Holy Trinity Anglican Church
- Interactive map of Pakaraka
- Coordinates: 35°21′27″S 173°57′23″E
- Country: New Zealand
- Region: Northland Region
- District: Far North District
- Ward: Bay of Islands/Whangaroa
- Community: Bay of Islands-Whangaroa
- Subdivision: Paihia
- Electorates: Northland; Te Tai Tokerau

Government
  - Territorial Authority: Far North District Council
  - Regional council: Northland Regional Council
  - Mayor of Far North: Moko Tepania
  - Northland MP: Grant McCallum
  - Te Tai Tokerau MP: Mariameno Kapa-Kingi

Pakaraka is a village in the Bay of Islands, Northland, New Zealand, at the junction of State Highway 1 and 10.

== History ==
A pā was located at the base, and on the slopes, of Pouerua, a 270 metres (890 ft) high basaltic scoria cone. The pā was studied during a major archeological project in the 1980s.

Parts of the Flagstaff War were fought around Pakaraka in 1845. After the Battle of Ōhaeawai on 23 June 1845 the British troops destroyed Te Haratua's pā at Pakaraka on 16 July 1845.

Mount Pouerua is registered with the Heritage New Zealand as a traditional site. Holy Trinity Church, The Retreat and the Store are also registered with the trust.

== Holy Trinity Church ==
The Holy Trinity Church is a Gothic Revival church constructed as a memorial to Henry Williams, who led the Church Missionary Society in New Zealand and was responsible for the conversion of many Māori to Anglicanism. Henry Williams had a 9,000 acres (3,600 ha) estate at Pakaraka, which includes where the church is situated. An earlier church was constructed on the site by Williams but this was removed to build the current church in 1873. The opening of the church was attended by the Bishop of Auckland William Cowie. The church is registered as a category 1 building.

== The Retreat ==
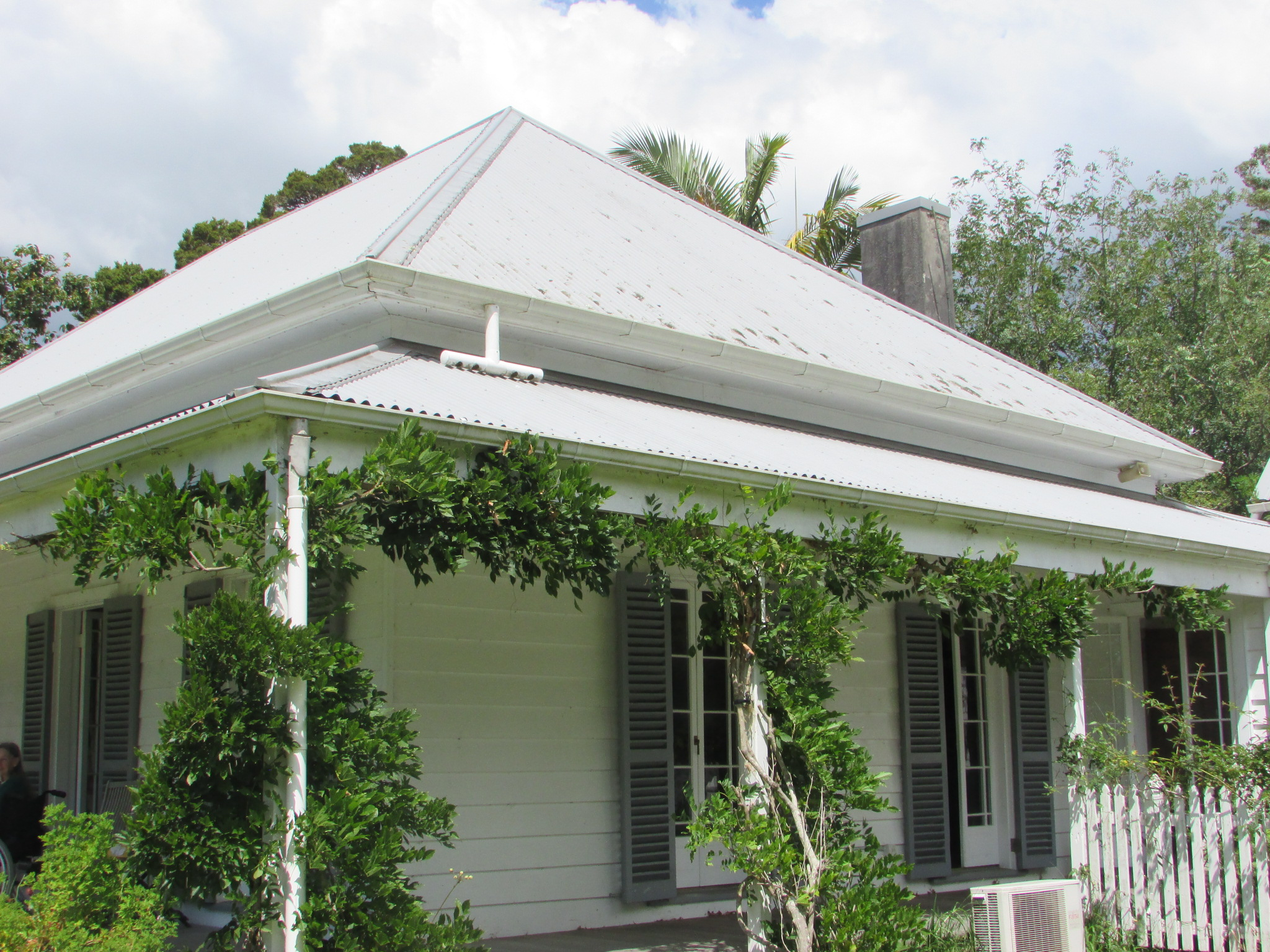
The Retreat

The Retreat is a Georgian homestead that was built by Williams in 1850–1852. Williams occupied the house until his death and conducted missionary activity from it. The Retreat is registered as a category 1 building.

== Demographics ==
Pakaraka statistical area covers 72.44 km^{2} (27.97 sq mi) and had an estimated population of 720 as of June 2025, with a population density of 9.9 people per km^{2}.

Historical population
Year	Pop.	±% p.a.
2006	507	—
2013	555	+1.30%
2018	666	+3.71%
2023	702	+1.06%

Pakaraka had a population of 702 in the 2023 New Zealand census, an increase of 36 people (5.4%) since the 2018 census, and an increase of 147 people (26.5%) since the 2013 census. There were 345 males, 357 females and 6 people of other genders in 243 dwellings. 2.6% of people identified as LGBTIQ+. The median age was 41.9 years (compared with 38.1 years nationally). There were 165 people (23.5%) aged under 15 years, 78 (11.1%) aged 15 to 29, 318 (45.3%) aged 30 to 64, and 141 (20.1%) aged 65 or older.

People could identify as more than one ethnicity. The results were 84.2% European (Pākehā); 34.6% Māori; 1.3% Pasifika; 0.9% Asian; 0.9% Middle Eastern, Latin American and African New Zealanders (MELAA); and 2.6% other, which includes people giving their ethnicity as "New Zealander". English was spoken by 97.9%, Māori language by 9.4%, and other languages by 6.4%. No language could be spoken by 2.1% (e.g. too young to talk). New Zealand Sign Language was known by 0.4%. The percentage of people born overseas was 15.8, compared with 28.8% nationally.

Religious affiliations were 26.5% Christian, 2.6% Māori religious beliefs, 0.4% Buddhist, and 1.3% other religions. People who answered that they had no religion were 61.1%, and 8.5% of people did not answer the census question.

Of those at least 15 years old, 81 (15.1%) people had a bachelor's or higher degree, 318 (59.2%) had a post-high school certificate or diploma, and 114 (21.2%) people exclusively held high school qualifications. The median income was $33,700, compared with $41,500 nationally. 36 people (6.7%) earned over $100,000 compared to 12.1% nationally. The employment status of those at least 15 was that 267 (49.7%) people were employed full-time, 102 (19.0%) were part-time, and 6 (1.1%) were unemployed.

== Education ==
Pakaraka School is a coeducational full primary (years 1–8) school with a roll of 66 students as of July 2026. The school opened in 1911. In 2024, all of the students were Māori. In October 2026, Pakaraka School became the first state school to convert to a charter school. The school is run by the Society of Holistic Learners, a charitable trust led by school parents.

== Notable people ==
- Hōne Heke, a Ngāpuhi chief, was born at Pakaraka in about 1807 or 1808. He was buried here in secret in August 1850. In 2011 his remains were removed due to possible development of the land around the burial site.
- The missionary Henry Williams retired to Pakaraka and built a church in 1850–51. The church that now stands on the site was opened on 27 November 1873.
- The first and third sons of the missionary Henry Williams, Edward & Henry farmed here.

== Gallery ==
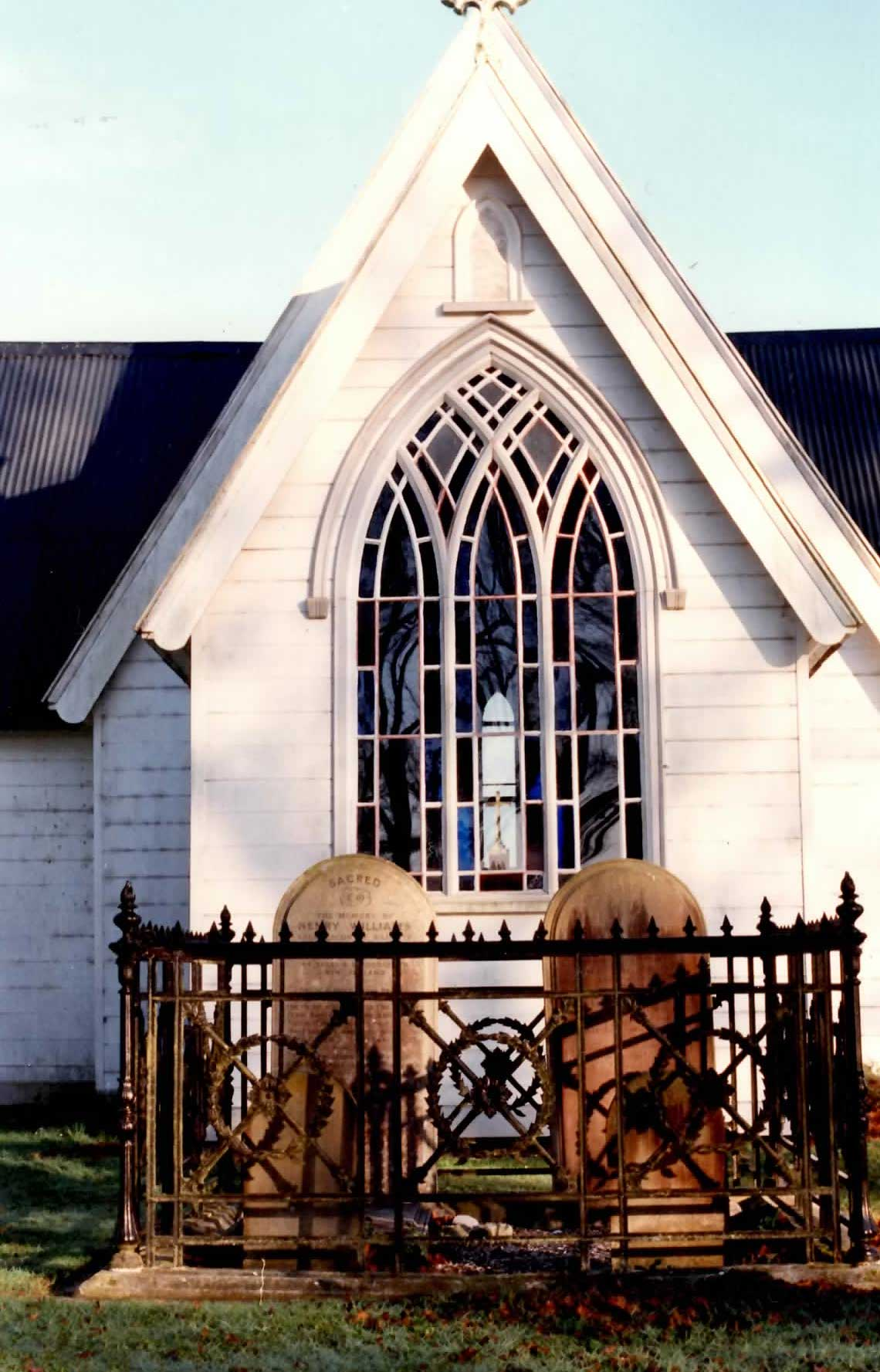
Gravestones of Henry and Marianne Williams, Holy Trinity Church

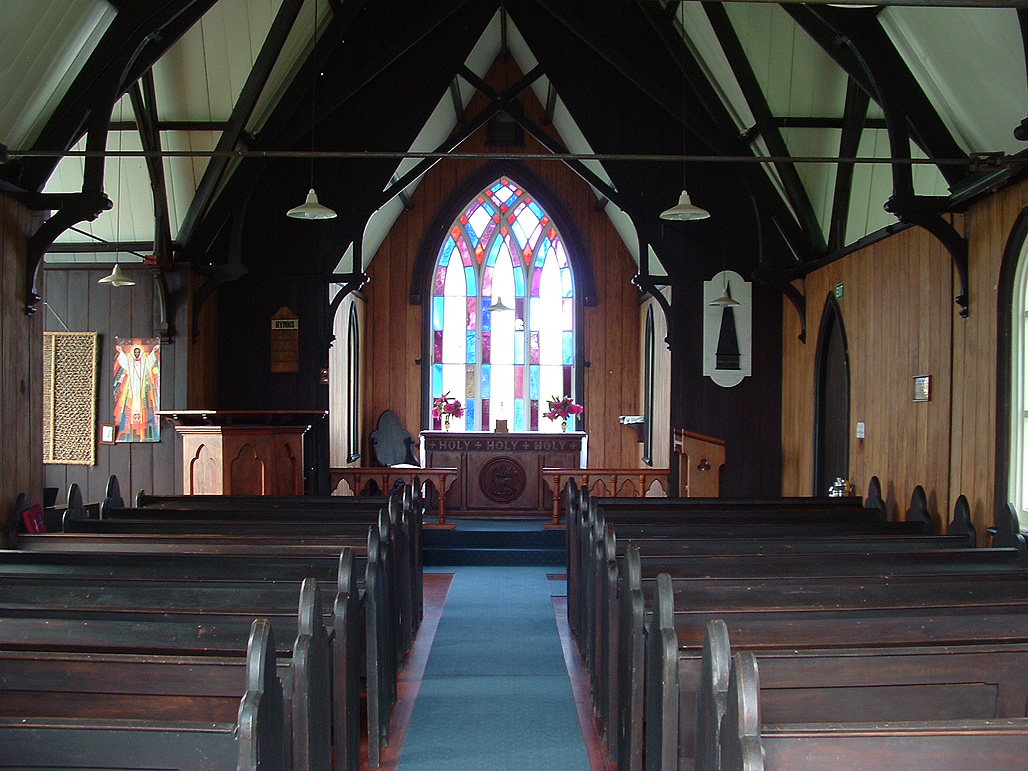
Interior of the Holy Trinity

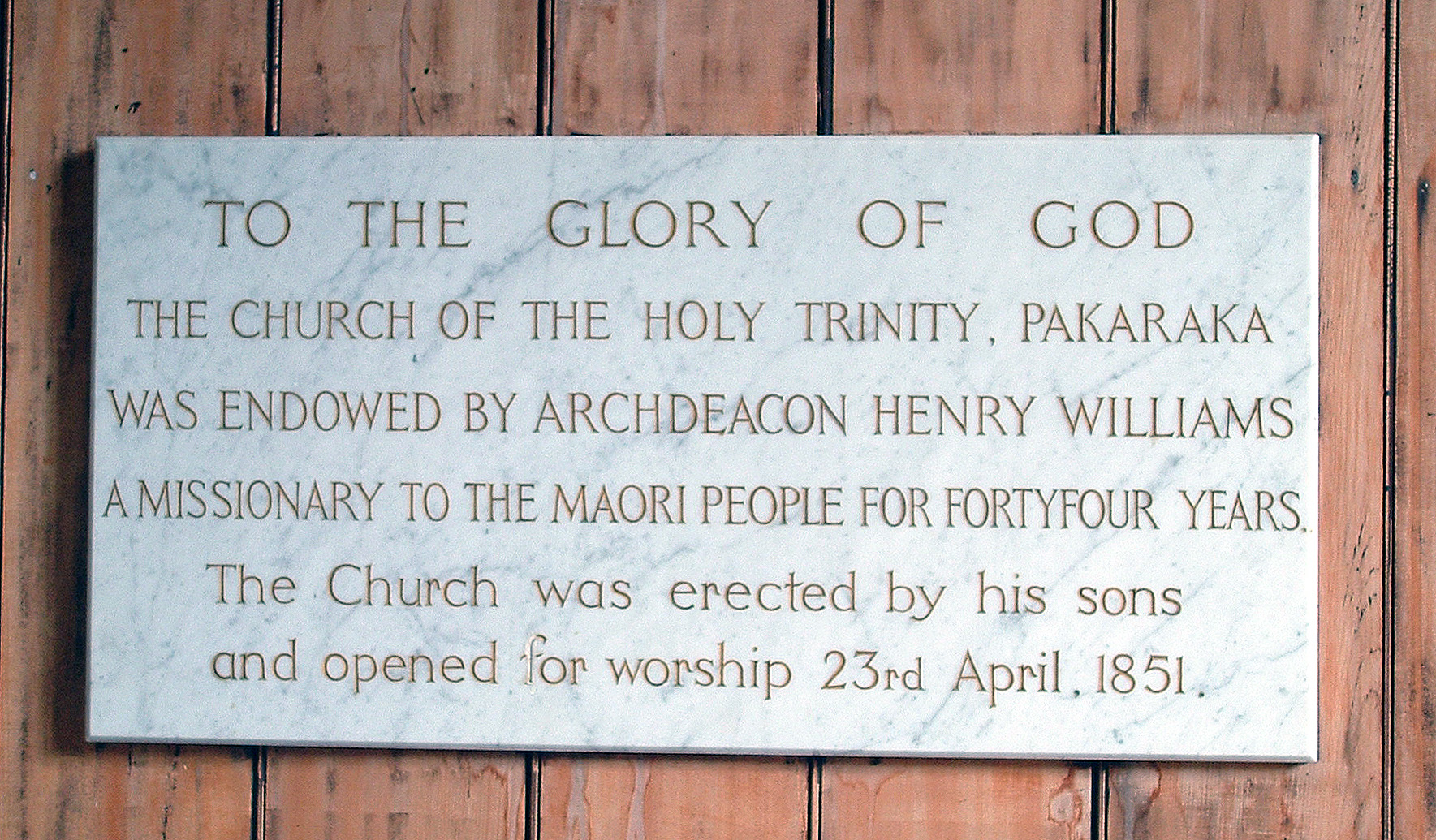
A plaque in the church

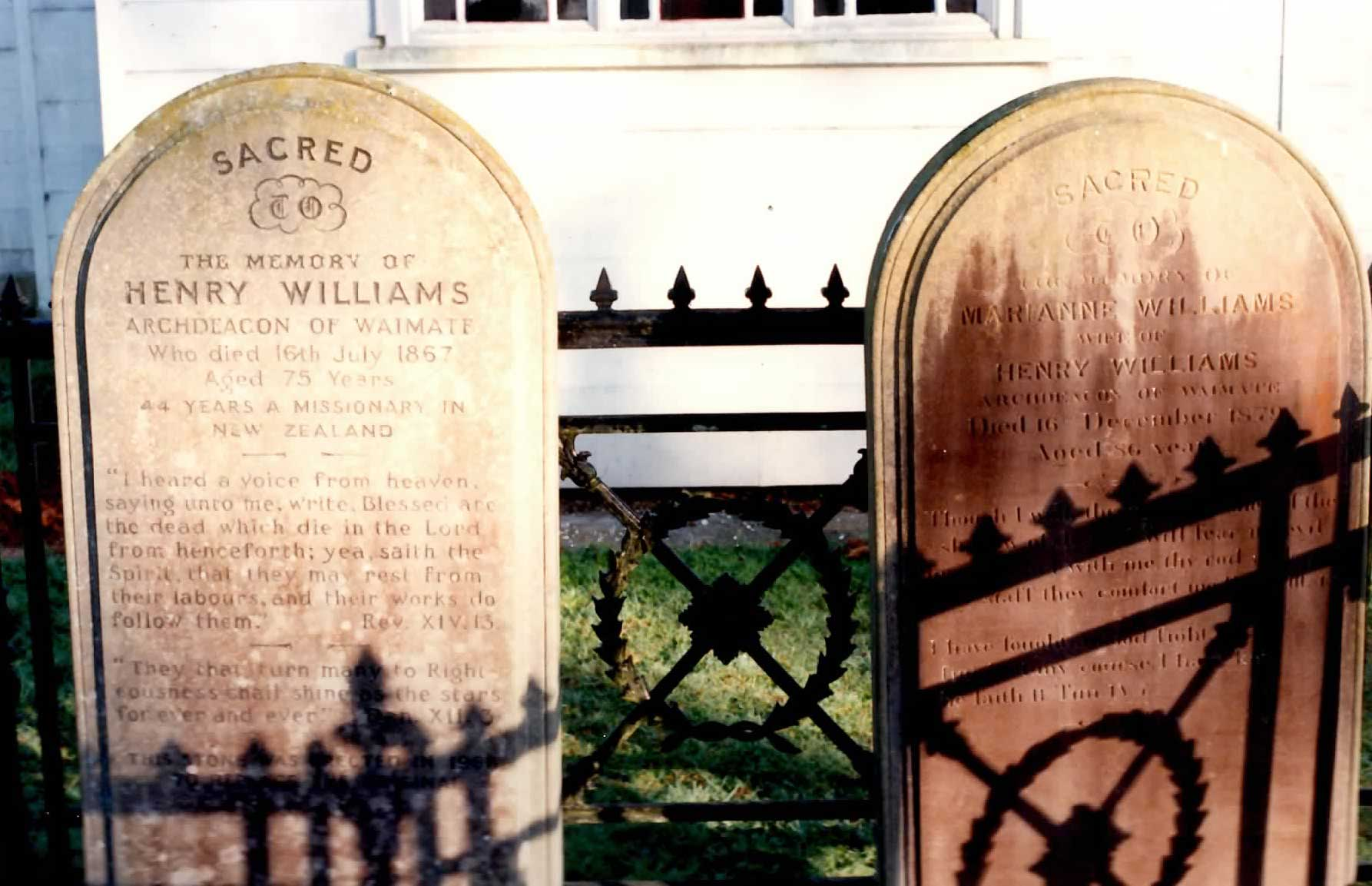
Gravestones of Henry and Marianne Williams
