= Church Missionary Society in New Zealand =

Organisation in New Zealand

The Church Missionary Society (CMS), an Anglican mission founded in England in 1799, sent missionaries to settle and work in New Zealand from 1814. The Rev. Samuel Marsden, the Society's agent and senior chaplain to the New South Wales government, officiated at its first service on Christmas Day in 1814, at Oihi Bay, within Rangihoua Bay in the Bay of Islands. Mission stations were founded in turn at Rangihoua, Kerikeri, Paihia and Waimate North, all in the Bay of Islands area. Later they were established in other parts of the country.

A branch of the CMS, the New Zealand Church Missionary Society (NZCMS), was founded in 1892, to send missionaries from New Zealand to other countries. The NZCMS works within the Anglican Communion and Protestant, Evangelical Anglicanism.

== History ==
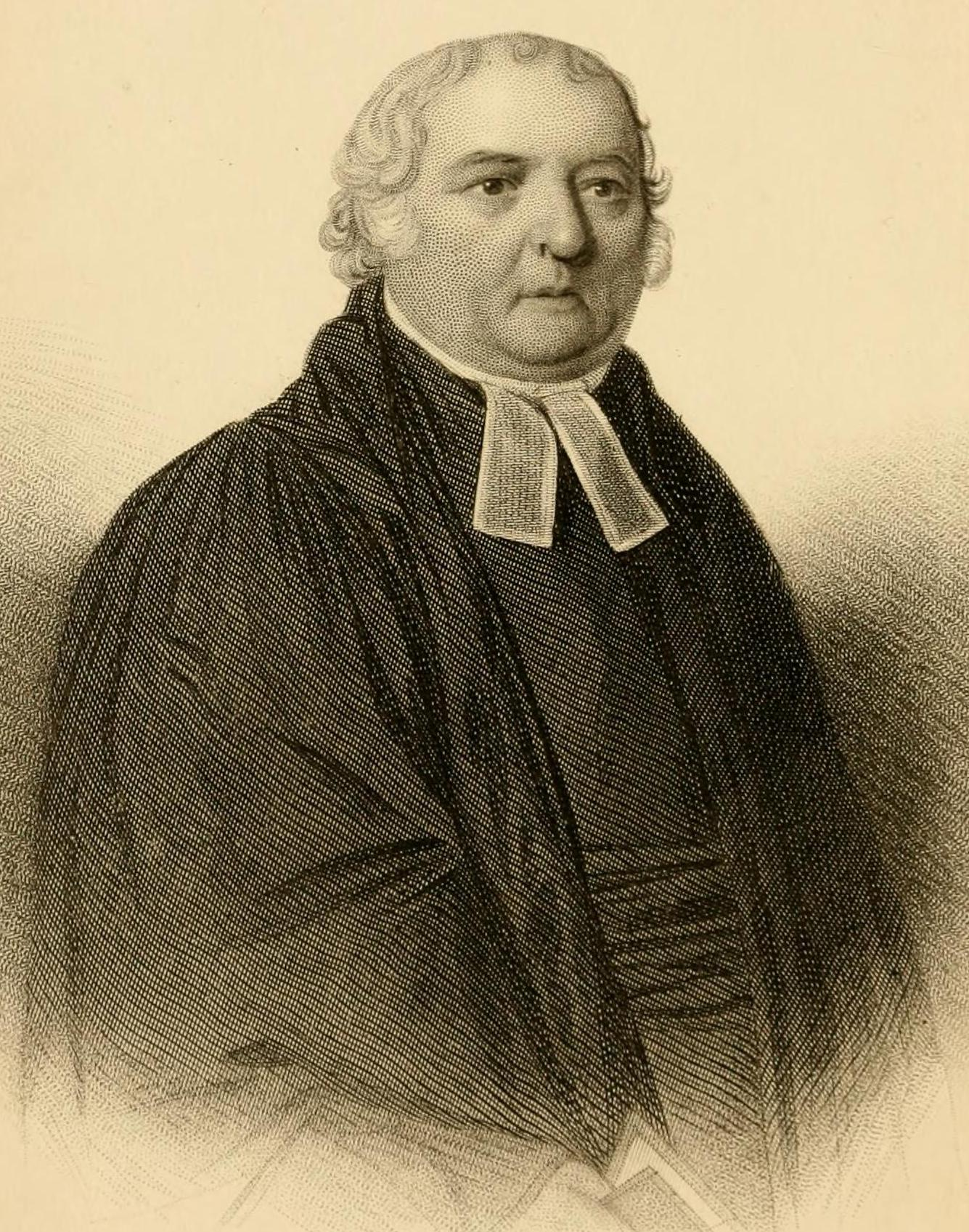
The Revd Samuel Marsden

=== Founding of the mission in New Zealand ===
The CMS founded its first New Zealand mission at Rangihoua Bay in the Bay of Islands in 1814 and over the next decade established farms and schools in the area. Thomas Kendall and William Hall were directed to proceed to the Bay of Islands in the Active, a vessel purchased by Samuel Marsden for the service of the mission, there to reopen communication with Ruatara, a local chief; an earlier attempt to establish a mission in the Bay of Islands had been delayed as a consequence of the Boyd massacre in Whangaroa harbour in 1809. Kendall and Hall left New South Wales on 14 March 1814 on the Active for an exploratory journey to the Bay of Islands. They met rangatira (chiefs) of the Ngāpuhi including Ruatara and his uncle Hongi Hika; Hongi Hika and Ruatara travelled with Kendall when he returned to Australia on 22 August 1814. Kendall, Hall and John King returned to the Bay of Islands on the Active on 22 December 1814 to establish the Oihi Mission at Rangihoua. The protector of the mission station was Ruatara; following his death in 1815, Hongi Hika accepted responsibility for the protection of the mission.

In April 1817 William Carlisle and his brother-in-law Charles Gordon joined the mission from New South Wales. Carlisle was engaged as a schoolteacher, and Gordon to teach agriculture; they remained at the mission until 1819. In 1819 Marsden made his second visit to New Zealand, bringing with him John Gare Butler as well as Francis Hall and James Kemp as lay settlers. William Puckey, a boatbuilder and carpenter, came with his family, including William Gilbert Puckey, to assist in putting up the buildings at Kerikeri. In 1820, Marsden paid his third visit, on HMS Dromedary, bringing James Shepherd.

Butler and Kemp took charge of the Kerikeri mission, but proved unable to develop a harmonious working relationship, and from 1822 to 1823 Butler was in dispute with Marsden. In 1823, Marsden paid his fourth visit, bringing with him Henry Williams and his wife Marianne as well as Richard Davis, a farmer, and William Fairburn, a carpenter, and their respective families. In 1826 Henry's brother William and his wife Jane joined the CMS mission and settled at Paihia in the Bay of Islands. The immediate protector of the Paihia mission was the chief Te Koki and his wife Ana Hamu, a woman of high rank and the owner of the land occupied by the mission.

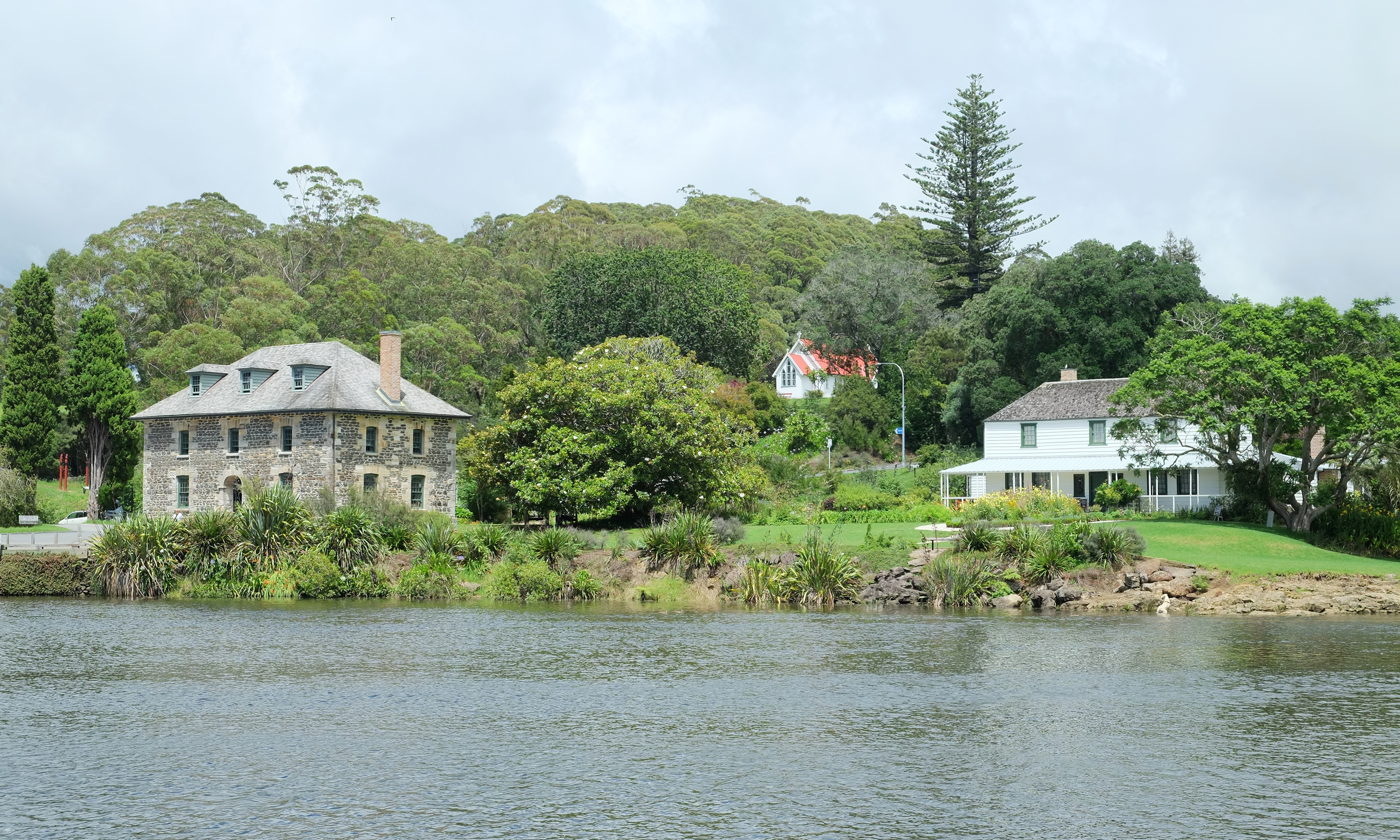
Kerikeri Mission Station with the Stone Store at left, St James at rear and Mission House on the right

=== Work of the mission in New Zealand ===
The CMS Mission House in Kerikeri, completed in 1822, is New Zealand's oldest surviving building. In the early days the CMS funded its activities largely through trade. Thomas Kendall sold weapons to Māori people, with muskets being the primary item traded by whaling and sealing ships for food; with this trade in weapons resulting in the Musket Wars (1807–1842). Kendall brought Māori war chief Hongi Hika to London in 1820, creating a minor sensation. When Henry Williams became the leader of the missionaries at Paihia in 1823, he immediately stopped the trade in muskets. The mission schools provided religious education and literacy skills in the Māori language, as well as English language skills. Karaitiana Rangi was the first person baptised, which occurred in 1825. However the evangelical mission of the CMS achieved success only after the baptism of Ngāpuhi chief Rawiri Taiwhanga in 1830. His example influenced others to be baptised into the Christian faith. The CMS established farms at Kerikeri and at Te Waimate mission and engaged workers from Sydney to assist in the farming; William Spikeman, a herdsman, arrived in 1833. In 1833 a mission was established at Kaitaia in Northland as well as a mission at Puriri on the Waihou River. In 1835 missions were established in the Bay of Plenty and Waikato regions at Tauranga, Matamata and Rotorua. The possessions of these missions were plundered during an inter-tribal war between the Māori people of Matamata, Rotorua and the Waikato river. In 1836 a mission was open in the Manukau Harbour region.

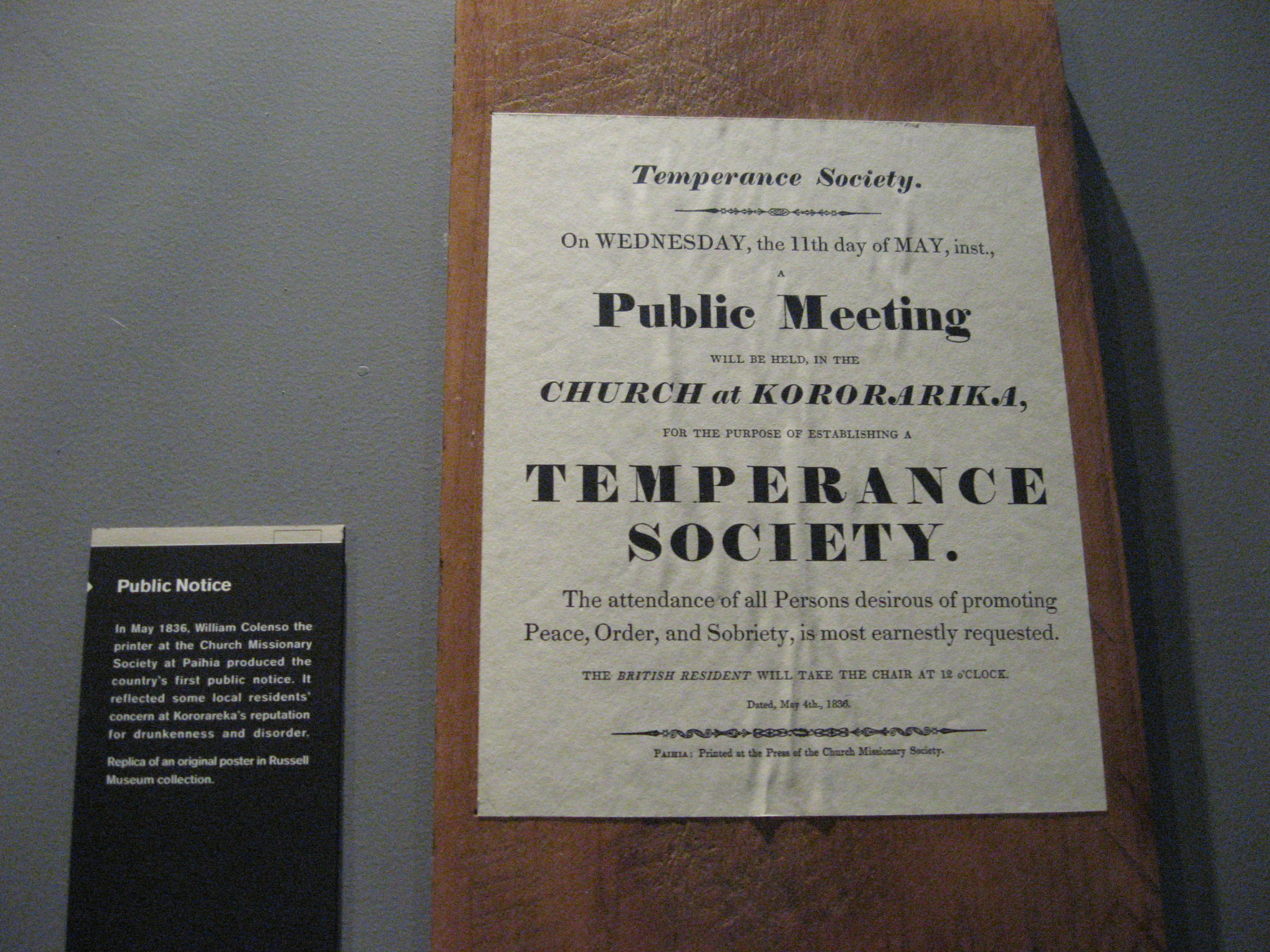
The first public notice in New Zealand, printed for Kororarika [sic] by the press of the Church Missionary Society in Paihia, in the Bay of Islands

=== Salary and allowances of CMS missionaries ===
In 1832 the salary of single laymen or catechist was £30 per annum; a married couple were paid £50 p.a.. Ordained ministers were paid £80 p.a.. All children received a free education, with board, at the CMS school at Te Waimate mission. Children under school age had an allowance of £10. After that £18 was allowed for each child up to the age of fifteen.

The CMS provided rations to the missionary families of 8 pounds (3.6 kg) of flour per week for a male, and 6 pounds (2.7 kg) for a female, with half ration for each child up to seven or eight years of age. There was an allowance of sugar, tea and soap, but if mustard, pepper, vinegar and other luxuries were required, these had to be purchased from the mission store.

=== Herald ===
Henry Williams commissioned a ship to provision the Paihia Mission and to visit the more remote areas of New Zealand to bring the Gospel to the Māori people. William Hall, William Puckey (Senior), William Gilbert Puckey designed and built Herald, a 55-ton schooner, using timbers salvaged from the wreck of the Brampton, plus other timbers procured locally. Gilbert Mair, who became her sailing master, and Māori carpenters also worked on Herald's construction.

Herald was launched on 24 January 1826. Herald went to Sydney, Australia four times; the Bay of Plenty four times; and sailed three times around the North Cape, to Hokianga Harbour on the west coast of the North Island of New Zealand. On 6 May 1828 Herald was wrecked on the Hokianga bar.

=== Translation of the Bible into the Māori language ===
The first book published in the Māori language was A Korao no New Zealand! The New Zealanders First Book!, published by Thomas Kendall in 1815. In 1817 Tītore and Tui (also known as Tuhi or Tupaea (1797?–1824)) sailed to England. They visited Professor Samuel Lee at Cambridge University and assisted him in the preparation of a grammar and vocabulary of Māori. Kendall travelled to London in 1820 with Hongi Hika and Waikato (a lower ranking Ngāpuhi chief) during which time work was done with Professor Samuel Lee, which resulted in the First Grammar and Vocabulary of the New Zealand Language (1820). The CMS missionaries did not have a high regard for this book. Williams organised the CMS missionaries into a systematic study of the language and soon started translating the Bible into Māori. After 1826 William Williams became involved in the translation of the Bible and other Christian literature, with Henry Williams devoting more time to his efforts to establish CMS missions in the Waikato, Rotorua and Bay of Plenty.

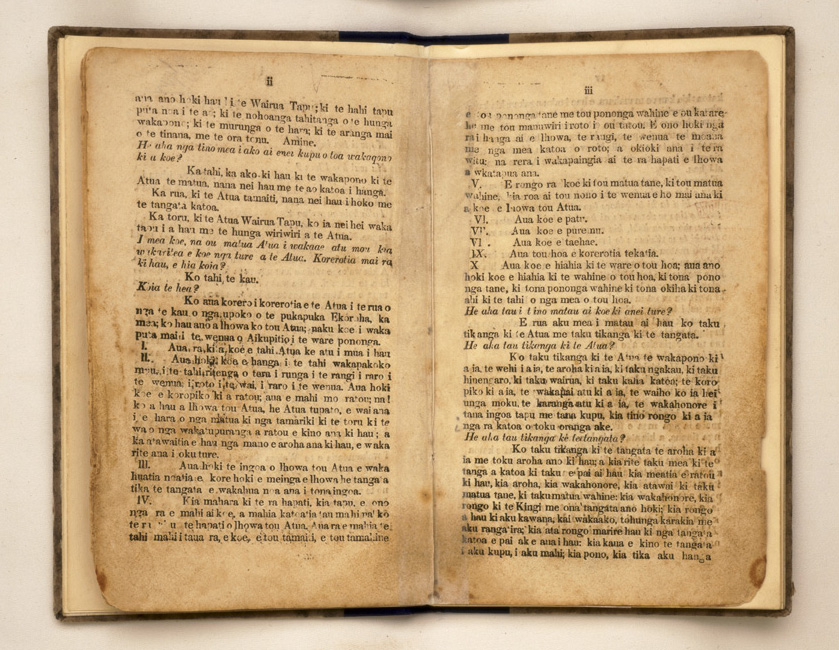
Page ii and iii of Ko te Katekihama III, printed by William Yate, 1830

In July 1827 William Colenso printed the first Māori Bible, comprising three chapters of Genesis, the 20th chapter of Exodus, the first chapter of the Gospel of St John, 30 verses of the fifth chapter of the Gospel of St Matthew, the Lord’s Prayer and some hymns. It was the first book printed in New Zealand and his 1837 Māori New Testament was the first indigenous language translation of the Bible published in the southern hemisphere.

By 1830 the CMS missionaries had revised the orthography for writing the Māori language; for example, ‘Kiddeekiddee’ became, what is the modern spelling, ‘Kerikeri’.

In 1830 during William Yate's stay in Sydney, New South-Wales, he supervised the printing of an edition of 550 copies of a translation of the first three chapters of the Book of Genesis; the first eight chapters of the Gospel according to St. Matthew; the first four chapters of the Gospel according to St. John; the first six chapters of the Epistle of St. Paul to the Corinthians; parts of the Liturgy and Catechism.

William Gilbert Puckey collaborating with William Williams on the translation of the New Testament, which was published in 1837 and its revision in 1844. William Williams published the Dictionary of the New Zealand Language and a Concise Grammar in 1844.

The translation and printing of the Book of Common Prayer was completed by November 1841. The greater number of the Collects were translated by the Rev. William Williams; the Sacramental and Matrimonial Services by William Puckey; and the remaining Collects, with the Epistles from the Old Testament, Thanksgivings, and Prayers, Communion of the Sick, Visitation of the Sick, Commination, Rubrics, and Articles of Religion, by William Colenso. From May to September 1844 a committee consisted of Archdeacon William Williams, the Rev. Robert Maunsell, James Hamlin, and William Puckey revising the translation of the Common-Prayer Book.

After 1844 Robert Maunsell worked with William Williams on the translation of the Bible, with Maunsell working on the translation of the Old Testament, portions of which were published in 1840. In 1845 the Book of Common Prayer was translated by a committee comprising William Williams, Robert Maunsell, James Hamlin and William Puckey. The full translation of the Bible into the Māori language was completed in 1857.

The Rev. William Williams and the Rev. T. W. Meller M.A., the Editorial Superintendent of the British and Foreign Bible Society, worked to revise the translation of the New Testament. In 1853, 15,000 copies were printed in England. These copies, when circulated, made the total number of 106,221 copies of the New Testament printed in the Māori language and distributed by the CMS and Wesleyan Missionary Society in New Zealand. In the early 1860s Elizabeth Fairburn Colenso helped prepare the revised Māori Old Testament and New Testament for the press. She correcting the printed copy, sometimes suggesting alternative translations. The first edition of the full Māori Bible was published in 1868.

=== Influence of the CMS in New Zealand ===
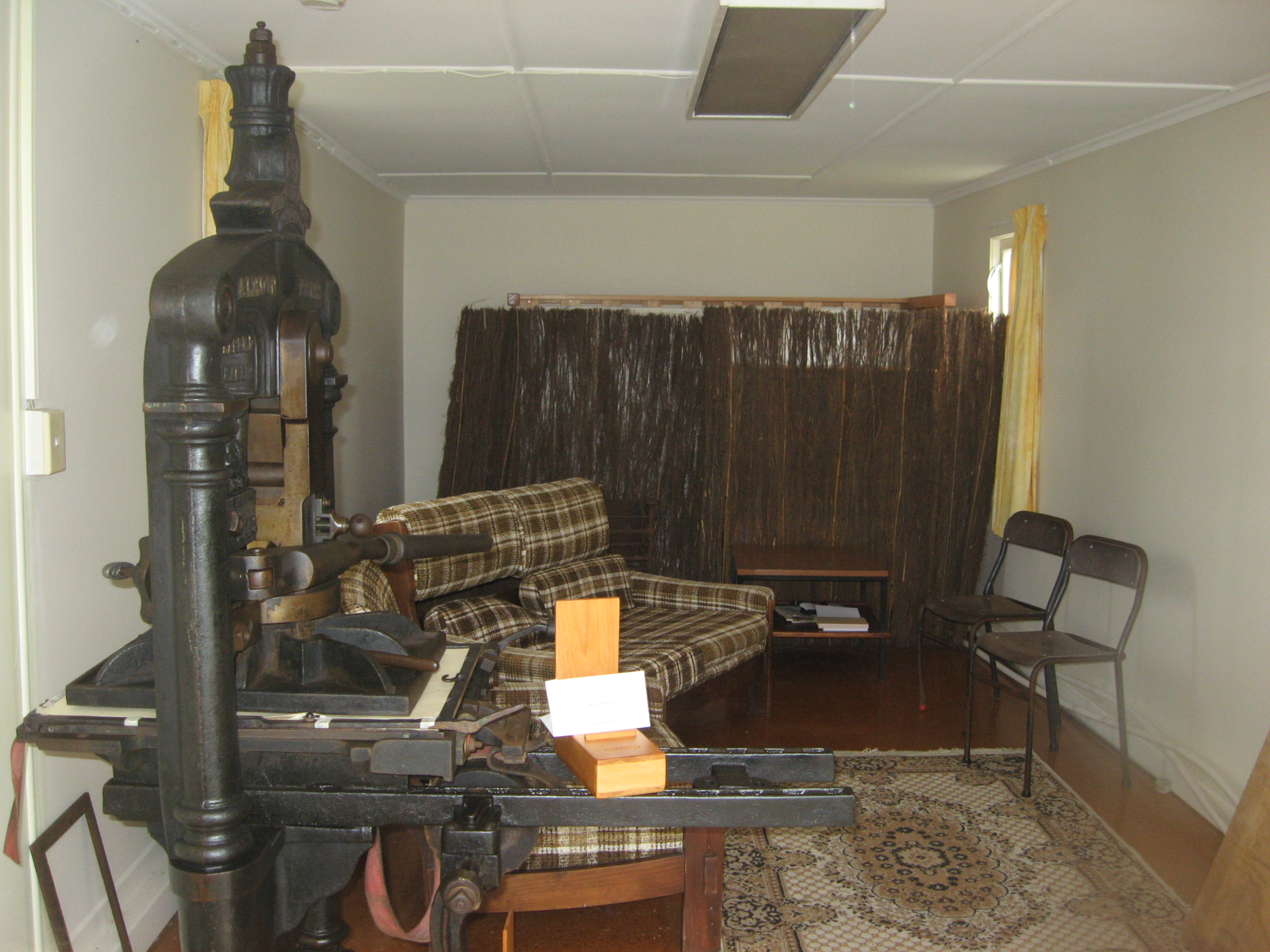
A press at "Haven of History", a reconstruction of the CMS mission station in Paihia, with a press in the same style of William Colenso's

The concern about the European impact on New Zealand, particularly lawlessness among Europeans and a breakdown in the traditional restraints in Māori society, meant that the CMS welcomed the United Kingdom's annexation of New Zealand in January 1840, with Henry Williams assisting Captain William Hobson by translating the document that became known as the Treaty of Waitangi. Henry Williams was also involved in explaining the treaty to Māori leaders, firstly at the meetings with William Hobson at Waitangi, but also later when he travelled to Port Nicholson, Queen Charlotte's Sound, Kapiti, Waikanae and Otaki to persuade Māori chiefs to sign the treaty. His involvement in these debates brought him "into the increasingly uncomfortable role of mediating between two races".

The CMS missionaries held the low church beliefs that were common among the 19th century Evangelical members of the Anglican Church. There was often a wide gap between the views of the CMS missionaries and the bishops and other clergy of the high church traditions of the Oxford Movement (also known as the Tractarians) as to the proper form of ritual and religious practice. Bishop Selwyn, who was appointed the first Anglican Bishop of New Zealand in 1841, held the high church (Tracharian) views, although he appointed CMS missionaries to positions in the Anglican Church of New Zealand including appointing William Williams as the first Bishop of Waiapu.

The CMS reached the height of its influence in New Zealand in the 1840s and 1850s. Missions covered almost the whole of the North Island and many Māori were baptised. The number of Māori who attended public worship at CMS churches was estimated at 50,000 and the Communicants at between 5,000 and 6,000. Māori converts engaged in missionary work. Te Manihera and Kereopa were killed in 1847 when they travelled onto the land of hostile Māori. However the murderers later welcomed a Christian missionary to reside in their land.

The efforts of the CMS resulted in the ordination of Māori clergy: Rota Waitoa was ordained in 1853; Riwai Te Ahu in 1858; Raniera Kawhia, Hohua Te Moanaroa, Heta Tarawhiti and Pirimona Te Karari in 1860; Tamihana Huata, Ihaia Te Ahu, Matiu Taupaki and Piripi Patiki in 1861; Matiaha Pahewa in 1863; Mohi Tūrei, Hare Tawhaa and Watene Moeke in 1864; Rihara Te Rangamaro in 1866; Renata Tangata and Raniera Wiki in 1867; Wiremu Katene Paraire and Hone Pohutu in 1870; Rawiri Te Wanui, Heneri Te Herekau, Wiremu Turipona and Wiremu Pomare in 1872.

In 2014, Thomas Hocken's archives of the Church Missionary Society, held at the Hocken Collections, were added to the UNESCO Memory of the World Register.

== Early CMS personnel in New Zealand ==
The CMS provided training for missionaries at the Church Missionary Society College, Islington, London. Bishop George Selwyn established St. John’s College at Te Waimate mission in June 1842 to provide theology to candidates for ordination into the Anglican Church. In 1844 Bishop Selwyn moved St John’s College to Auckland. The CMS in London began to reduce its commitment to the CMS mission in New Zealand in 1854, and no further missionaries were sent out until Joseph Sydney Hill and William Goodyear arrived in 1878; they were the last CMS missionaries sent out from England. Members of the mission who arrived before 1854 included:

- The Reverend Benjamin Yate Ashwell and his wife Harriet Elizabeth arrived in 1835, and worked from 1839 at Kaitotehe Mission near Mount Taupiri and at Otawhao in the valley of the Waipā River; and remained at that mission into the 1840s. In 1846 he was located at the Kaitotehe Mission. Died 29 September 1883.
- The Rev. Charles Baker and his wife Hannah arrived on 9 June 1828, and worked at Kerikeri; then at Kororareka (Russell); and they were at the mission station at Uawa (Tolaga Bay) from 1843 to 1851. Died 6 February 1875.
- The Rev. Ralph Barker and his wife Mary Ann arrived in November 1850 and was appointed to East Cape; where he remained until 1852. He ended his connection with the CMS in 1854.
- The Rev. Alfred Nesbit Brown and his wife Charlotte arrived in October 1829. He was put in charge of the school at Paihia. In 1835 he opened a mission station at Matamata and from 1838 he was working at Te Papa Mission at Tauranga. In 1843 he was ordained as Archdeacon of Tauranga. In 1846 he was assisted by the Rev. C.P. Davies. Died 7 September 1884.
- The Rev. Robert Burrows and his wife Charlotte Eliza arrived in 1840; He was appointed a deacon on 10 June 1838 and ordained a priest on 26 May 1839. He was at Kororareka (Russell) in 1845. From 1845 – 1852 he worked at Te Waimate mission. Died 22 August 1897.
- The Rev. John Gare Butler and his wife Hannah arrived 12 August 1819. Butler ceased working for the CMS in 1822.
- The Rev. Thomas Chapman and his wife Anne Maria arrived in 1830 and established a mission station at Rotorua in 1835; and remained at that mission into the 1840s. In 1844 he attended the St. John's College at Te Waimate Mission and on 22 September 1844 he was appointed a deacon. On 6 June 1852 he was ordained a priest. He worked at the Rotorua Mission until 1861 when he moved to Auckland where he continued to work for the CMS as a teacher at St. Stephen School for Native Girls in Parnell. Died 22 December 1876.
- The Rev. George Clarke and his wife Martha and family (including their son George Clarke jr.) arrived on 4 April 1824. George was trained as a blacksmith and was appointed to Kerikeri, then he worked at Te Waimate mission from 1830 to 1840. Their son Edward Bloomfield Clarke joined the CMS in 1849.
- The Rev. William Colenso arrived in December 1834 to work as a printer and catechist. William and Elizabeth Colenso worked at the Waitangi Mission at Awatoto, Mission from 1844 Napier from 1844, until William Colenso was dismissed from the CMS in 1852.
- Elizabeth Fairburn Colenso was the daughter of Sarah Tuckwell and her husband, William Fairburn. She was born at the CMS mission at Kerikeri. She became fluent in Māori. She married William Colenso on 27 April 1843. Following his ordination as a deacon in September 1844, they established the Waitangi mission station at Awatoto in Hawke's Bay. She became aware that William was the father of Wiremu, a child born in 1850 to Ripeka Meretene, who was a member of the household. Only after William’s adultery became public knowledge in 1853 did they separate. Elizabeth continued to work for the CMS as a teacher at the Kaitotehe Mission near Mount Taupiri in the Waikato. In the 1860s she worked on the manuscripts of the translation of the Bible into a Māori, including correcting proofs and suggesting alternative translations.
- The Rev. Richard Davis and his wife Mary arrived on 7 May 1824. He was a farmer and established a garden at the Paihia Mission. In 1830 he established a farm at Te Waimate mission and remained there until 1845. He was ordained on Trinity Sunday 1843. He was appointed to Kaikohe from 1845 to 1854, then he returned to Te Waimate Mission from 1854 to 1863. Died 28 May 1863.
- The Rev. Christopher Pearson Davies, a surgeon, studied for his ordination in 1844 at St John’s College, when it was located at Te Waimate. He married Marianne Williams, a daughter of Henry Williams and his wife Marianne. In 1846 Davies was at the Tuaranga Mission, and after that until 1856 he was at the Ōpōtiki Mission. Died 2/3 March 1861.
- The Rev. William Charles Dudley and his wife Elizabeth arrived in 1842. Dudley worked at Te Papa Mission at Tauranga, Wairoa and the Kaweranga Mission on the Hauraki Gulf. His connection with the CMS ended on 28 October 1854.
- John Edmunds, a stone mason, arrived in 1834 with his wife and 5 sons to assist in the completion of the stone store in Kerikeri that was used by the CMS. He then worked on the stone wharf in front of the store. He left the service of the CMS in 1839. He was responsible for constructing stone walls along the Inlet Road in Kerikeri.
- William Thomas Fairburn, a carpenter, and his wife Sarah accompanied Marsden on his second visit to New Zealand in 1819. In 1823 he was in Sydney and returned on board the Brampton with Henry & Marianne Williams; In October 1833 he went with John Wilson, James Preece and John Morgan to establish a mission station at Puriri on the Waihou River. In 1840 he was at the mission station at Maraetai, and was at the Puriri Mission in 1842. His daughter Elizabeth married William Colenso.
- Samuel Hayward Ford and his wife Martha arrived on 22 August 1837, and Ford began his duties as the missionary surgeon at Paihia. He remained with the CMS until 1840, when he moved to Te Wahapu Point, 4 kilometres (2.5 mi) south of Kororareka (nowadays Russell). As the result of the Flagstaff War, he lived in Auckland from 1845 to 1849. He continued to practice as a surgeon and he established a hospital at Russell in 1858 “for destitute seamen and others”. He died on 19 July 1876.
- The Rev. Thomas Samuel Grace and his wife Agnes arrived in July 1850. He replaced William Williams at Tūranga in Poverty Bay from 1850–1853, during the latter’s trip to Britain. He established a mission station at Taupō. In 1865 the Pai Mārire ransacked his house. Grace, who had fled from Taupō to Ōpōtiki, was caught up in the Völkner Incident. In the 1870s he rebuilt the Taupō Mission. Died 30 April 1879.
- The Rev. Octavius Hadfield arrived in December 1838 and was ordained a minister at Paihia on 6 January 1839, and in November of that year he travelled to Otaki with Henry Williams, where he established a mission station. He was appointed as Archdeacon of Kāpiti, then Bishop of Wellington from 1870 to 1893 and Primate of New Zealand from 1890 to 1893. Died 11 December 1904.
- Francis Hall arrived 12 August 1819 and remained until 1823.
- William Hall and his wife Dinah arrived on Active on 22 December 1814. Hall was a ship-carpenter. He drew the plans for Herald and worked on her construction. He left for Sydney in ill-health in 1824 on Herald's maiden voyage.
- The Rev. James Hamlin, flax dresser and weaver, and his wife Elizabeth arrived in March 1826 with William and Jane Williams. He served as a catechist at Te Waimate mission and later at the mission stations at Kerikeri and Mangapouri, (near Te Awamutu on the northern bank of the Puniu River, near where it joins the Waipā River). In 1836 he became the head of the Manukau Mission. In 1844 his son Ebenezer Hamlin was born and Hamlin was ordained a deacon and sent to Wairoa, Hawkes Bay; in 1863 he was ordained a minister. Died 15 November 1865.
- John King and his wife Hannah arrived on the Active on 22 December 1814. He was a shoemaker by trade; with the CMS he was employed as a catechist, teaching the Māori at the Oihi Mission, and when that mission station was closed, in 1832 he and James Shepherd moved their families to Te Puna Mission on the Purerua Peninsula. He also served at Rangihoua. King was engaged in work to effect improvement in the dressing of flax (harakeke in Māori). He was still with the CMS in 1845.
- James Kemp and his wife Charlotte arrived 12 August 1819. Kemp was a catechist, school teacher and blacksmith at Kerikeri; he was the keeper of the mission stores at the Kerikeri mission and lived at Mission House.
- The Rev. Thomas Kendall and his wife Jane arrived on the Active on 22 December 1814. He was dismissed from the CMS in August 1822.
- George Adam Kissling and Margaret Kissling worked at the Kawakawa (Hicks Bay) Mission from 1843 to 1846. His ill-health forced a move to Auckland. In 1846 the Kisslings established a Māori girls boarding school in Kohimarama and 1851 the Kisslings established St. Stephen’s School for Native Girls in Parnell; while the girls school closed in 1860, St. Stephen’s School became a theological college for Māori clergy. George Kissling died 9 November 1865. Margaret Kissling died on 20 September 1891.
- The Rev. Thomas Lanfear was appointed a deacon on 18 June 1848 and ordained as a priest on 3 June 1849. Lanfear and his wife Frances arrived in 1849 and was appointed to the Puriri Mission in December 1849 and remained until January 1865.
- The Rev. Samuel Marsden Knight (a nephew of Samuel Marsden) arrived in June 1835. In 1836 he was teaching at Ohinemutu near Rotorua. His connection with the CMS ended in 1865. Died in 1890 in Penshurst, Australia.
- The Rev. John Mason attended the CMS College at Islington, London. He was appointed at deacon on 22 September 1839. Mason and his wife Martha arrived in 1840 and established a mission station at Whanganui. He was ordained as a priest on 25 September 1842 at Wellington. He drowned on 5 January 1843 while crossing the Turakina River.
- The Rev. Joseph Matthews arrived in 1832. He attended the CMS College, Islington in 1830. He arrived in New Zealand on 26 March 1832 and was appointed a catechist teacher at Te Waimate Mission. He married Mary Ann Davis on 16 December 1833 at Te Waimate. He attended the St. John's College at Te Waimate in 1843. He and William Gilbert Puckey established a mission station at Kaitaia. He was appointed a deacon on 22 September 1844 at Te Waimate and on 7 August 1859 he was ordained a priest at Auckland. Matthews remained in Kaitaia until he retired in 1883. Died 3 November 1895.
- Richard Matthews was the brother of Joseph Matthews. Richard Matthews arrived in 1835. He married Johanna Blomfield, sister of Mrs Martha Blomfield Clarke who was the wife of George Clarke. He served the CMS in Kaitaia, then was transferred to the Whanganui Mission.
- The Rev. Robert Maunsell attended the CMS College at Islington, London in 1832. He was appointed as a deacon on 22 December 1833 and he was ordained a priest on 21 December 1834. Maunsell and his wife Susan arrived in 1835 and he was sent to establish the Maraetai Mission at Waikato Heads at Port Waikato in the same year. He continued at the Manukau Mission into the 1840s. From 1849 – 1865 he worked at the Kohanga Mission at the Waikato Heads. Maunsell worked with William Williams on the translation of the Bible. Maunsell focused on the Old Testament, portions of which were published in 1840 with the full translation completed in 1857. He became a leading scholar of the Māori language. His son George joined the CMS. He died 19 April 1894.
- The Rev. John Morgan attended the CMS College at Islington, London in 1832. He arrived in New Zealand in 1833, and in December of that year he worked with William Fairburn, John Wilson and James Preece to establish the Puriri Mission at Thames. He moved to the Mangapouri Mission in May 1835. On 26 August 1835 he married Maria Mathew Coldham, the sister of Marianne Williams. In 1842 he moved to the mission station at Otawhao. In 1849 he attended the St. John's College in Auckland and was appointed a deacon on 24 June 1849. In 1846 Morgan helped to construct 3 water mills that were built by the local Māori to mill wheat for sale. On 18 December 1853 he was ordained as a priest. In the early 1860s he acted as a government agent and reported on the Māori King Movement in the Waikato. His activities resulted in his expulsion from Otawhao in April 1863 following the Invasion of the Waikato by colonial government forces. He acted as a chaplain to the military forces in 1863–64. He resigned from the CMS in October 1864 and died on 8 June 1865.
- Henry Miles Pilley, catechist and carpenter, arrived in February 1834 and worked in the Rotorua district. His connection with the CMS ended in 1838.
- James Preece, catechist, arrived in 1830 and in December 1833 he worked with William Fairburn, John Wilson and John Morgan to establish the Puriri Mission; and continued at that mission into the 1840s. He moved to Kauwaeranga (near Shortland), then from 1847 to 1856 he was a missionary at Ahikareru, near Te Whaiti in Te Urewera. His connection with the CMS ended in 1837. Preece was buried at Coromandel in 1870.
- William Puckey, carpenter, arrived on 12 August 1819 with his wife Margery, son William Gilbert, and daughter Elizabeth. William and Margery left the mission in 1826.
- William Gilbert Puckey arrived with his parents in 1819, then joined the CMS in 1821. He helped build, then served as the mate of the 55-foot schooner Herald. He went to Sydney with his parents in 1826 then returned to the Bay of Islands the following year. He and Joseph Matthews established the Kaitaia Mission in 1834. As he had become fluent in the Māori language since arriving as a boy of 14, he was a useful translator for the CMS mission, including collaborating with William Williams on the translation of the New Testament in 1837 and its revision in 1844.
- The Rev. Charles Lucas Reay arrived in 1842 and was first located in Cloudy Bay and then at Nelson in 1844, then he was transferred to Rangitukia at East Cape in 1847, where he died on 11 March 1848.
- James Shepherd visited with Marsden in 1817 and was placed at the Oihi Mission, and when that mission station was closed in 1832 he and John King moved their families to Te Puna Mission Station on the Purerua Peninsula. He was a skilled gardener, who taught the Māori how to plant vegetables, fruit and trees. He was generally employed among the different tribes, instructing them in the Christian religion, as he understood the Māori language better than any of the other missionaries at that time. He and his wife Harriet also served at the mission stations at Rangihoua, Kaeo, and at Whangaroa.
- The Rev. Seymour Mills Spencer from Hartford, Connecticut, arrived in Auckland in 1842 with his wife Ellen Stanley Spencer and was stationed at the Te Papa Mission at Tauranga and also working at Rotorua from 23 November 1843. Spencer was ordained to be the deacon for the district of Taupō on 24 September 1843, but ended up being posted to the Rotorua Mission. Spencer was at the Maketu Mission in 1844. In 1944 the couple established the first missionary station at Lake Tarawera; working with the local Māori they built a European-styled community called Te Wairoa. He was suspended from the CMS in 1844, then rejoined the CMS in 1849 and was stationed at Ōpōtiki until about 1855; then the couple returned to the Te Wairoa mission station and remained there until 1883. Died 30 April 1898.
- The Rev. James Stack, arrived in New Zealand on 8 October 1827. He was a Wesleyan missionary at Kaeo; then he later joined the CMS and in 1835 he was sent to the Puriri Mission at Thames where his son James West Stack was born. In 1839 Stack and his wife Mary joined William Williams at the Tūranga Mission in Poverty Bay; and in 1859 he was in the Waikato. His connection with the CMS ended in 1860. Died 18 April 1883.
- The Rev. Richard Taylor and his wife Mary arrived in 1836 on the Achilles. In September 1839 he succeeded William Williams as principal of the boys’ school at Te Waimate Mission and remained there until 1842. The Revd Taylor moved to join the Whanganui Mission in 1842. Died 10 October 1873.
- John Telford, Colenso's successor as mission printer, was stationed at Otaki from about 1840. He went to England at the end of 1847 to study at the CSM Islington Institute. He returned to New Zealand in 1849 and spent 10 months at St John's College. He fell out with Bishop Selwyn and left the College to work as a catechist at Pipiriki under Richard Taylor. He was at Whanganui in 1851, and at Pipiriki in 1853. His connection with the CMS ended in 1853.
- The Rev. Carl Sylvius Völkner was sent to New Zealand by the North German Missionary Society, arriving in August 1849. In 1852 he offered his services to CMS and assisted the Revd Robert Maunsell, by teaching in the school at the Manukau Mission. He married Emma Lanfear, sister of a CMS missionary. Völkner was ordained a priest in 1861 and took charge of the CMS mission station at Ōpōtiki in August that year. On 1 March 1865 he was captured by the Pai Mārire led by Patara, a chief, and Kereopa Te Rau, a Pai Mārire prophet. Völkner was hanged and decapitated at his church grounds on 2 March 1865 in what became known as the Völkner Incident.
- William Richard Wade and his wife Sarah arrived in December 1834 and worked with William Colenso at Paihia. In 1835 he took over as the superintendent of the printing press. He later established Te Papa Mission at Tauranga in 1836. His connection with the CMS ended in 1840.
- The Rev. John Alexander Wilson retired from the navy and in 1832 he joined the CMS as a lay missionary. In 1833, he and William Fairburn, John Morgan and James Preece opened a mission station at Puriri on the Waihou River, and in 1836 he and William Wade went to Te Papa Mission at Tauranga. His wife Anne Wilson died on 23 November 1838, leaving her four young sons, including John Alexander Wilson to be brought up by their father. In 1840 he established a mission station at Ōpōtiki. He was ordained a deacon in 1852. in 1860 he was a missionary-chaplain to Māori war-parties at Waitara, Taranaki. His connection with the CSM ended on 21 January 1868.
- The Rev. Henry Williams and Marianne Williams arrived in the Bay of Islands in 1823. Henry Williams was appointed as the leader of the CMS mission in New Zealand. In 1844 Williams was installed as Archdeacon of Te Waimate in the diocese centered at Te Waimate mission.
- The Rev. William Williams and Jane Williams arrived in the Bay of Islands in 1826. William Williams led the CMS missionaries in translating the Bible into Māori and he also published an early dictionary and grammar of the Māori language. Williams was appointed Archdeacon of the East Cape diocese and later as the first Bishop of Waiapu.
- The Rev. William Yate arrived in the Bay of Islands on 19 January 1828. He was appointed to lead Te Waimate mission. His personal life became a matter of controversy and he was dismissed from the CMS on 24 February 1837.

== New Zealand Church Missionary Society ==
New Zealand Church Missionary Society
- Abbreviation: NZCMS
- Formation: 1892
- Type: Evangelical Anglicanism; Ecumenism; Protestant missionary
- Headquarters: 78 Peterborough Street; Christchurch; 8144; New Zealand
- Website: www.nzcms.org.nz

In 1892, Eugene Stock and the Rev. Robert Stewart were sent to Australia and New Zealand by the parent CMS organisation to facilitate the formation of Church Missionary Associations in both countries, in order that those associations would select, train and send out missionaries. In 1892 the New Zealand Church Missionary Association was formed in a Nelson church hall. Funding from the UK stopped completely in 1903. The association was established under the sanction of the Bishops of Waiapu and Nelson, with the Rev. Frederick William Chatterton as Clerical Secretary, and J. Holloway as Lay Secretary and Treasurer. The association provided workers for the Māori Mission, the Melanesian Mission, the CMS Missions in China, Japan, India and Africa, and for the Church of England Zenana Missionary Society. In 1893 Miss Marie Louise Pasley, the first missionary candidate, was selected, and subsequently sent to Japan.

The association changed its name to the New Zealand Church Missionary Society (NZCMS) in 1916. In 2000 the NZCMS amalgamated with the South American Missionary Society of New Zealand. The NZCMS works closely with the Anglican Missions Board, concentrating on mission work outside New Zealand and has been involved in Pakistan, East Africa, the Middle East, Cambodia, South Asia, South America and East Asia. It is part of the CMS Mission Network and the global network of mission agencies Faith2Share.

== See also ==
- Anglican Church in Aotearoa, New Zealand and Polynesia
- Bible translations into Oceanic languages
- Church Missionary Society in China
- Church Missionary Society in India
- Church Missionary Society in the Middle East and North Africa

== Bibliography ==
CMS in New Zealand:

- Mission and Moko: aspects of the work of the Church Missionary Society in New Zealand, 1814–1882, Robert Glen (ed.). Latimer Fellowship of New Zealand (1992) ISBN 047301646X
- Barton, R. J. (1927). Earliest New Zealand: the Journals and Correspondence of the Rev. John Butler. Early New Zealand Books (ENZB), University of Auckland Library.
- Coleman, John Noble, ed. (1865). Memoir of the Rev. Richard Davis. Early New Zealand Books (ENZB), University of Auckland Library.
- Carleton, Hugh (1874). The life of Henry Williams, Archdeacon of Waimate, Volume I. Auckland NZ. Online available from Early New Zealand Books (ENZB).
- Carleton, Hugh (1877). The life of Henry Williams, Archdeacon of Waimate, Volume II. Auckland NZ. Online available from Early New Zealand Books (ENZB).
- Fitzgerald, Caroline (2004). Letters from the Bay of Islands, Sutton Publishing Limited, United Kingdom; ISBN 0-7509-3696-7 (Hardcover). Penguin Books, New Zealand, (Paperback) ISBN 0-14-301929-5
- Fitzgerald, Caroline (2011). Te Wiremu – Henry Williams: Early Years in the North, Huia Press, New Zealand, (Paperback) ISBN 978-1-86969-439-5
- Grace, D., A Driven Man – Missionary Thomas Samuel Grace 1815–1879: His Life and Letters, Wellington : Ngaio Press, 2004
- Pilditch, Jan (ed.). The Letters and Journals of Reverend John Morgan, Missionary at Otawhao, 1833–1865, Volumes 1 and 2. The Grimsay Press, 2010. In association with the University of Waikato.
- Pilley, Henry Miles (1838). The New Zealand missionary. Cheltenham : William Wight, digital publication: National Library of Australia (NLA).
- Savage, John (1835). An Account of New Zealand: And of the Formation and Progress of the Church Missionary Society's Mission in the Northern Island. R.B. Seeley and W. Burnside.
- Stock, Eugene (1913). "The Story of the New Zealand Mission".
- Williams, Henry, The Early Journals of Henry Williams 1826 to 1840, Rogers, Lawrence M. (ed.). Christchurch : Pegasus Press (1961). online available at New Zealand Electronic Text Centre (NZETC)
- Williams, William, Christianity among the New Zealanders. London (1867). Online available from Archive.org.
- Williams, William, The Turanga Journals, 1840–1850. F. Porter (ed.). Wellington, 1974.Online available from ENZB
- Williams, Frederic Wanklyn. "Through Ninety Years, 1826–1916: Life and Work Among the Maoris in New Zealand: Notes of the Lives of William and William Leonard Williams, First and Third Bishops of Waiapu". Early New Zealand Books (NZETC).
- Wilson, C.J., ed. (1889). "Missionary Life and Work in New Zealand, 1833 to 1862: Being the Private Journal of the Late Rev. John Alexander Wilson". Early New Zealand Books (NZETC).
- Yate, William (1835). An Account of New Zealand: And of the Formation and Progress of the Church Missionary Society's Mission in the Northern Island. R.B. Seeley and W. Burnside.
