= Piripi Patiki =

19th-century Māori chief, teacher, and blind missionary from New Zealand

Piripi Kingi Karawai Patiki
- Born: 1813 near Titoki, New Zealand
- Died: 4 October 1881 (aged 67–68); Waiparera, Hokianga, New Zealand
- Other name: Philip
- Occupations: Anglican minister and Missionary
- Spouse: Meri Te Ao Karere (married 1845)

Piripi Kingi Karawai Patiki (1813–4 October 1881) was a teacher and missionary, who was blind. Of Māori descent, he was a rangatira (chief) of the Ngāpuhi iwi (tribe). He was born near Titoki in the Mangakahia Valley, Northland, New Zealand. Sir William Martin, the first chief justice of New Zealand, said of Piripi Patiki that he resembled the well-known bust of Socrates.

In 1834 he went to live with James Kemp and Thomas Chapman at the Kerikeri Mission of the Church Missionary Society (CMS). He was baptised on 20 January 1839 by the Rev. William Williams at the Kaitaia Mission of the CMS.

On 21 February 1841 he was appointed as a catechist at the Kaitaia Mission of the CMS, where he worked with William Gilbert Puckey and Joseph Matthews. In 1854 he became the catechist at the CMS Mission at Whangape Harbour. In 1859 he attended St. Stephen's College Auckland. He was ordained as a deacon on 22 December 1861 at St Paul's Church, Auckland, together with Matiu Te Huia Taupaki. In 1861 he was appointed as the minister for the Hokianga Heads district and as the deacon assisting the Rev. Richard Davis at Kaikohe. In 1863 he was appointed as deacon to assist the Rev. Edward Blomfield Clarke at St. John the Baptist Church.

He was ordained as a priest on 23 April 1871 at St. John the Baptist Church, the church build by the CMS at Te Waimate mission. The first session of the Native Church Board of the Archdeaconry of Waimate was held at Te Waimate mission in April 1872. The session was preceded by a service, at which the Lessons were read by the Revs. Renata Tangata and Piripi Patiki. On 22 September 1872 he preached the sermon at the ordination of Rawiri Te Wanui, and Heneri Te Herekau as deacons, and also at the ordination of Māori clergy in 1878.

He is associated with the Ripeka Tapu Church at Waiparera. In 1867 the land for the church was set aside by the Te Rarawa chiefs, Herewini Te Toko and Wiremu Tana Papahia. They vested the land for the church in Patiki, who was stationed at Hokianga Heads from 1871 until the Ripeka Tapu Church and the vicarage were completed. The construction of the church began in about 1873 and was completed in 1878.

He continued at the Hokianga Heads district until his death in 1881.
