= Octavius Hadfield =

New Zealand bishop (1814–1904)

The Most Reverend Octavius Hadfield
- Primate Bishop of New Zealand
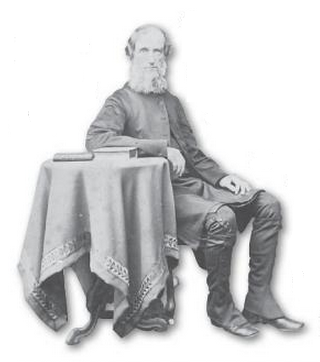
- Predecessor: Henry Harper

Personal details
- Born: Octavius Hadfield; 6 October 1814 Bonchurch, Isle of Wight, England
- Died: 11 December 1904 (aged 90) Edale, near Marton, New Zealand
- Buried: St John’s Anglican Church, Porewa, near Marton, New Zealand
- Denomination: Anglicanism
- Spouse: Catherine (Kate) Williams

Octavius Hadfield (6 October 1814 – 11 December 1904) was an English Anglican bishop. He was the Archdeacon of Kapiti, the Bishop of Wellington from 1870 to 1893, and the Primate of New Zealand from 1890 to 1893. He was a member of the Church Missionary Society in New Zealand for thirty years. He was recognised as an authority on Māori customs and language. His views on Māori rights, expressed in several books, strongly criticised the actions of the New Zealand Government.

== Early life ==
Hadfield was born on 6 October 1814 in Bondchurch, Isle of Wight, England. His family was affluent, but he often had very poor health and nearly died on several occasions. He received an excellent university education but did not finish his degree due to ill health. As a member of a wealthy family, he was able to tour through Europe.

== Career ==
Normally, lack of a degree would have prevented him from being ordained, but he became an Anglican minister and was able to secure a position in New Zealand.

=== Church Missionary Society ===
Hadfield joined the Church Missionary Society in New Zealand (CMS) in October 1837. He was admitted to deacon's orders in September 1838 in Sydney by William Broughton, the Bishop of Australia. Hadfield was very friendly with Samuel Marsden but did not share his views on high church Anglicanism. The CMS missionaries held the low church beliefs that were common among the 19th century Evangelical members of the Anglican Church.

In December 1838, Hadfield arrived in the Bay of Islands, New Zealand in M.S. Pelorus, travelling with Bishop Broughton, who was making a pastoral visit to the native church established by the CMS among the Māori. On 6 January 1839, Hadfield became the first priest to be ordained in New Zealand. Hadfield was stationed at Paihia in the Bay of Islands.

Following a request by Tāmihana Te Rauparaha and Mātene Te Whiwhi for a missionary in their area, Hadfield travelled with Henry Williams to establish a CMS mission on the Kāpiti Coast in the lower North Island of New Zealand in November 1839. In 1840, Hadfield baptised Riwai Te Ahu, who later became an Anglican minister, at the Waikanae Mission. He baptised Pineaha Te Mahauariki, who also became an Anglican minister, in 1842.

In December 1843, Bishop Selwyn, the first Anglican Bishop of New Zealand, visited Ōtaki, New Zealand, to confirm a young chief and 142 of his followers. Selwyn appointed Hadfield the rural dean of the Western District of Wellington and Taranaki in 1844, and as archdeacon of Kapiti in March 1849.

== Relations with the Māori ==
During his early years, Hadfield travelled throughout the Wellington Region that had been conquered by numerous Taranaki tribes. He became close friends with the Ngāti Toa leader Te Rauparaha, who had led the invasion of the wider Wellington region during the long-running Musket Wars. It was Te Rauparaha's Christian son Tāmihana who had invited him to the Māori community to live. Hadfield buried Te Rauparaha in 1849 after his release from imprisonment. Te Āti Awa built the first church within the Waikanae pā, which inspired other churches, including Rangiātea, built by Ngāti Raukawa in Ōtaki during 1848–1851.

Hadfield became part of the Ōtaki Ngāti Raukawa community, where he made every effort to learn Māori language and customs and shared these with governor George Grey. They went to the same church. He lived in the community for thirty years, established twenty mission schools, and became well integrated into the Māori community. In 1852, he published a spelling book for Māori children. Later he became increasingly intolerant and dogmatic in his views as he clashed with the government. He lived in an age when the early influence of missionaries had declined.

Following the Wairau Affray in 1843, where a confrontation between Te Rauparaha and a group of settlers left 22 Europeans dead, many settlers believed an attack on then thinly populated Wellington was possible. Hadfield was seen as a peacemaker preventing the spread of hostilities. Hadfield became far less popular in 1860, when he upheld Wiremu Kīngi Te Rangitāke's claim to the Waitara block. The surveying of this land before military occupation precipitated the First Taranaki War, and Hadfield became a leading critic of the government in these actions. He "was for some time the most unpopular man in the colony". He was described in the press at the time as "a traitor and a bigoted meddlesome missionary".

In 1877, Wiremu Parata took Hadfield and the Church to court over a gift of land which was not used for a school as intended; the far-reaching case Wi Parata v the Bishop of Wellington was lost when the Treaty of Waitangi was ruled a simple nullity.

== Personal life ==
Hadfield married Catherine (Kate) Williams (24 February 1831 – 8 January 1902), a daughter of the Rev. Henry Williams and Marianne Williams, on 19 May 1852.

Hadfield died on 11 December 1904 in Edale, near Marton, New Zealand. He was buried at St John's Anglican Church, Porewa, near Marton.

== Publications ==
- A discourse delivered at St. Peter's Church, Te Aro by Octavius Hadfield (Wellington, (N.Z.): Robert Stokes, 1851)
- Hadfield, Octavius (1860). "One of England's little wars: a letter to the Right Hon. the Duke of Newcastle, Secretary of State for the Colonies". London : Williams & Norgate, digital publication: Early New Zealand Books (ENZB), University of Auckland Library.
- Hadfield, Octavius (1861). "A sequel to "One of England's little wars:" being an account of the real origin of the war in New Zealand, its present stage, and the future prospects of the colony". London : Williams & Norgate, digital publication: Early New Zealand Books (ENZB), University of Auckland Library.
- Hadfield, Octavius (1861). "The New Zealand War; the second year of one of England's little wars". London : Williams & Norgate, digital publication: Early New Zealand Books (ENZB), University of Auckland Library.
- A reply to the question, Is a miracle opposed to reason? by Octavius Hadfield (Wellington (N.Z.): Lyon and Blair, 1875)
- Hadfield, Octavius (1902). "Maoris of by-gone days". London : J.H. Shears, digital publication: Early New Zealand Books (ENZB), University of Auckland Library.

== See also ==
- New Zealand Church Missionary Society
