= Riwai Te Ahu =

New Zealand teacher and missionary

- Born: c1820 Waitara, New Zealand
- Died: 1 October 1866; Ōtaki, New Zealand
- Other name: Levi
- Occupations: Anglican Minister and Missionary
- Spouse(s): Heni Rohia (married 1843); Mata Te Matamata (married 1851)

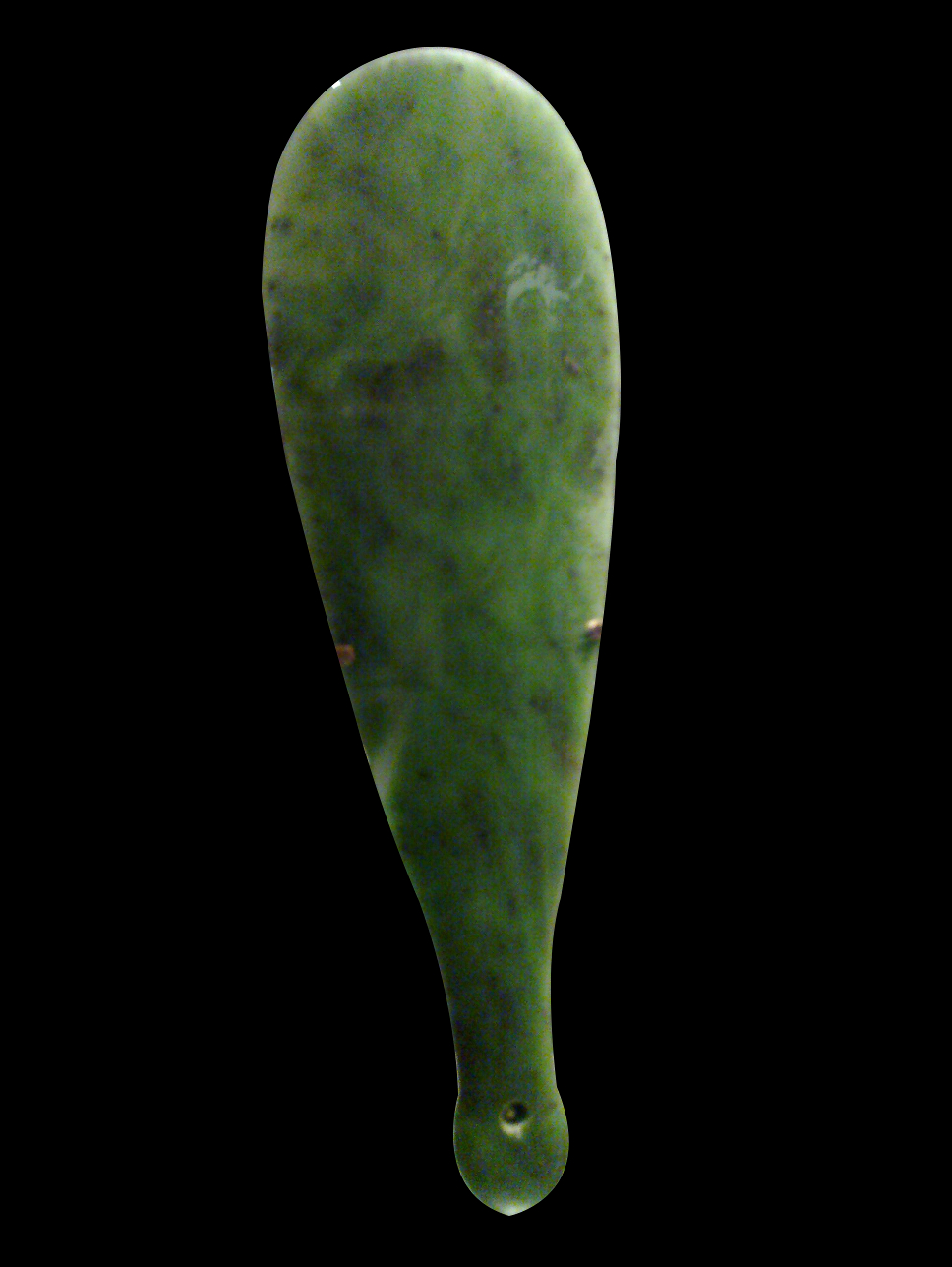
Kataore, Mere, pounamu (42cm x 12cm) named after a Ngāi Tahu chief killed by Te Rauparaha in the 1830s. Gifted by Riwai Keioni Te Ahu to Sir George Grey.

Riwai Te Ahu (c1821–1866) was a notable New Zealand teacher and missionary. Of Māori descent, he identified with the Ngāti Hinerangi and Ngāti Awa iwi (tribe). He was born in Waitara, Taranaki, New Zealand. He was the son of Tuhoe of Waiongana and Waipuia of Waitara. In 1840 he was baptised by the Rev. Octavius Hadfield at the Waikanae Mission of the Church Missionary Society (CMS).

From about 1840 to 1854 he was a catechist and teacher at the CMS mission at Waikanae. He worked with Hadfield to establish schools among the Māori people living in Queen Charlotte Sound, including at Okukari Bay.

Early in 1855 Bishop George Selwyn took him to Auckland in order that he might study for the ministry at St. John’s College under the direction of Archdeacon Kissling. Te Ahu was ordained a deacon on 23 September 1855 at St Paul's Church, Auckland by Bishop George Selwyn. He was the second Māori clergyman appointed a deacon, following his friend Rota Waitoa who was ordained a deacon in 1853.

In September 1855 he accompanied Bishop Selwyn and John Patteson on a pastoral visit to the South Island and the Chatham Islands. He was ordained a priest in 1858 and became a member of the CMS. On 11 July 1859 he was appointed as the assistant to the Rev. Hadfield at Ōtaki. In October 1859 he was a member of the first synod of the Diocese of Wellington. He managed schools in Queen Charlotte Sound and Tory Channel and was associated with the Anglican centre at Okukari Bay in Marlborough. He died at Ōtaki on 6 October 1866.

== External sources ==
- Hadfield, Octavius (1902). Maoris of by-gone days: Rev. Riwai Te Ahu. London : J.H. Shears, digital publication: Early New Zealand Books (ENZB), University of Auckland Library. pp. 15–18.
