= Benjamin Yate Ashwell =

Anglican missionary (1810–1883)

- Born: 26 May 1810; Birmingham, England
- Died: 29 September 1883 (aged 73); Remuera, New Zealand
- Occupations: Anglican minister and missionary
- Spouse: Harriet Elizabeth Churchill

Benjamin Yate Ashwell (26 May 1810 – 29 September 1883) was an English Anglican missionary and a member of the Church Missionary Society (CMS) mission in New Zealand in the 19th century. He was missionary to the Māori in the western Waikato region. In 1839 he was sent to Kaitotehe, near Mount Taupiri, where he established the Kaitotehe Mission, with branch missions at Te Awamutu and Otawhao in the valley of the Waipā River.

== Early years ==
Ashwell was born on 26 May 1810 at Birmingham, England. His father was Benjamin Ashwell, a brassfounder. Ashwell joined the CMS in 1831 and in 1832–33 he studied at the Church Missionary Society College, Islington. He was sent to the CMS mission in Sierra Leone as a lay missionary, however he returned to England on 23 September 1834 as he had become ill.

He married Harriet Elizabeth Churchill on 28 April 1835 at Woodstock, Oxford.

== CMS missionary work in New Zealand ==
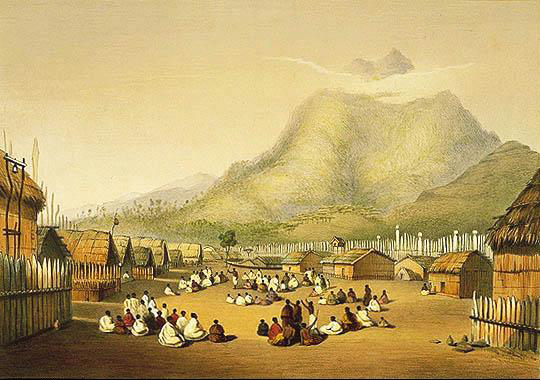
Tūkaitote, the pā of Pōtatau Te Wherowhero, first Māori King. In the Waikato, Taupiri mountain in the distance

Ashwell and his wife arrived in Paihia on 23 December 1835. He worked as a catechist among the Europeans at Kororāreka. In 1838 the Revd. Robert Maunsell and Ashwell set up a mission station and a school at Port Waikato among the Ngāti Tāhinga.

In 1839 he was sent to Kaitotehe, near Mount Taupiri, where he established the Kaitotehe Mission, with branch missions at Te Awamutu and Otawhao in the valley of the Waipā River. He remained at that mission into the 1840s. He was ordained in December 1848 after attending St John's College, Auckland. In 1846 he was asked to settled a dispute at Rotokauri between 2 hapū (subtribes) of the Waikato Tainui – the Ngāti Hine and the Ngāti Pou – respecting the right to take eels from a certain channel.

He was appointed as a deacon on 24 December 1848 after attending St John's College, Auckland. He was ordained as a priest on 22 May 1853.

From April to June 1860 Ashwell travelled on the schooner Southern Cross with the Rev. J.C. Patteson to visit the Melanesian Mission stations in the Loyalty Islands, New Hebrides, and Banks Islands. On 23 June 1860 while returning from Melanesia to New Zealand, the Southern Cross was wreaked in a storm near Ngunguru, Northland, without loss of life.

In the early 1860s, Ashwell opposed the Māori King Movement, which was a means of attaining Māori unity to halt the alienation of land at a time of rapid population growth by European colonists. In July 1863, Ashwell moved to Auckland following the Invasion of the Waikato by the colonial government forces who were sent to crush the Māori King Movement. Ashwell returned to Kaitotehe Mission at the end of 1864, however the war in the Waikato had scattered the Māori people who had supported the mission. He worked to re-establish the mission until the end of the 1860s, when he retired from missionary work to engage in church administration.

On 26 April 1883 he retired from the CMS. Ashwell died on 29 September 1883 at Remuera, Auckland.

== Sources ==
- Tagg, Mary Alison (2003). Te Ahiwera : a man of faith : the life of Benjamin Y. Ashwell, missionary to the Waikato. Anglican Historical Society.
- Ashwell, Rev. B. Y. (1860). Journal of a visit to the Loyalty, New Hebrides, and Banks' Islands, in the Melanesian Mission Schooner the Southern Cross, with an account of the wreck of that vessel. Auckland: Printed by W. C. Wilson, "New-Zealander" Office.
