= William Gilbert Puckey =

New Zealand missionary (1805–1878)

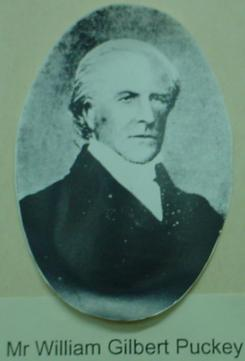

William Gilbert Puckey (5 May 1805 – 27 March 1878), born in Penryn, England, was a missionary in New Zealand. He accompanied his parents to New Zealand at the age of 14. He became widely regarded as one of the best interpreters of Māori in the fledgling mission. He was able to form relationships of trust with many influential Māori from a young age, and in particular, with Nōpera Panakareao, of Te Rarawa iwi at Kaitaia.

The night before the signing of the Treaty of Waitangi at Kaitaia, Panakareao called for Puckey and spent a long time discussing and questioning the meaning, translation, and significance of the term "kawanatanga" which Henry Williams had used in the Treaty. In Panakareo's speech to assembled chiefs, (translated by Puckey and recorded by Richard Taylor at the time), he endorsed the Treaty. He said he understood the words of the Treaty to mean that "the shadow of the land was passing to the Queen, while the substance remained with Māori", a view he perceptively and presciently reversed a year later in light of increasingly bitter practical experience in subsequent dealings with Pākehā authorities, when he stated that he saw that the substance of the land had passed to the Queen and that the shadow had remained with Māori.

In 1845 the Book of Common Prayer was translated by a committee comprising William Williams, Robert Maunsell, James Hamlin and William Puckey.

Puckey's fluency and empathy in te reo Māori helped him establish effective relationships and understandings with Māori in Northland. Few other Pākehā in the early years of contact could communicate as effectively between races. Puckey often referred to himself and his wife in his Journals as mere 'labourers in the vineyard', and though he was both modest and humble, the actual effect of his labours may have been under-rated, in his lifetime by Bishop Selwyn, who refused to consider him as a candidate for ordination, ostensibly because of his lack of Greek and Latin, (ignoring his well recognised ability to provide accurate translations of Māori), and by subsequent historians.

== Beginnings ==
Puckey was born in Penryn, Cornwall, and christened there on 5 June 1805. His parents were William Puckey senior and his wife, Margery (née Gilbert). William senior, and his brother James Puckey, had been in the original London Missionary Society (LMS) party that travelled out on the ship Duff, and attempted to establish a LMS mission in Tahiti in 1796, but when that mission failed, went on to Paramatta, Australia. William Puckey (senior) returned to England in 1800, married Margery Gilbert and had 4 children. The family including 3 surviving children left England in 1815 bound for Australia. The eldest girl, Caroline, died of convulsions in Rio de Janeiro, no doubt a traumatic event for the family. William established himself as a boat builder in Sydney and in November, 1819 William Gilbert and his sister Elizabeth, (later to marry Gilbert Mair) came with their parents to Kerikeri, New Zealand aboard the 'General Gates', on the second of Samuel Marsden's missions.

William Puckey senior had been a boat builder, mariner and carpenter in Cornwall, and probably made a significant contribution to the establishment of these skills in New Zealand, as a sawyer, carpenter, and boat builder, being involved in the selection of timbers, sawing of planks, and making of joinery for the Kemp House, and the building of the 55 foot schooner Herald for the CMS mission. William Puckey junior helped build, then served as the mate of the Herald; until the ship was wrecked in 1828 while trying to enter Hokianga Harbour.

Both his father William, and especially his mother Margery, succumbed to alcoholism under the conditions of life in early New Zealand, and both died in 1827 after an extended bout of drinking following the marriage of their daughter, after they had returned to Sydney. William Gilbert Puckey joined the CMS mission in his own right in 1821, and after accompanying his father back to Sydney in 1826, returned to New Zealand in 1827, and stayed here for the rest of his life.

This background, of growing up in his formative years in close contact with Māori communities, and witnessing the vicissitudes of the early mission settlements, was highly significant to his later development of strong and effective bonds with Māori around the mission stations he worked in, at Kerikeri, Paihia, Waimate, and the station he helped found and then stayed at Kaitaia.

On 11 October 1831, in the St. John the Baptist Church at Te Waimate mission, Puckey married Matilda Davis (who was then aged 17), second daughter of Rev. Richard Davis, thus becoming the first European couple recorded to be married in New Zealand. Their first child was born in early January 1833, but only survived for seven weeks.

== Expedition to the Reinga ==
Puckey was the first Pākehā to travel up the Ninety Mile Beach to 'Te Reinga' which is known today as Cape Reinga. It is the departing point of spirits in the Māori world-view, and that he was allowed to go there says something about the relationship he had been able to form with local Māori.

In December 1834, not long after his arrival and settlement in Kaitaia, he travelled in the company of an older Chief, Paerata, (-translates as 'the pilot'), an early convert to Christianity. They were questioned at Houhora as to their motives for wanting to travel to this most sacred place, and on their return were confronted by a large gathering of rangatira who were anxious that Puckey might be damaging the 'aka', the ladder down to the sea, whereby spirits were understood to depart for Hawaiiki.

A large hui sat to allow all opinions to be voiced, and at the end, Paerata stood and spoke for 2–3 hours, explaining what he and Puckey had done and discussed on their travels, and how the new Christian beliefs and philosophy that Puckey was espousing were not necessarily a threat to the customary beliefs of Māori.

== Adventures ==
When he was 14, Puckey set fire to the fern surrounding the mission station, causing great alarm. Missionary J.G Butler recorded in his diary on 6 January 1821 that the fire, “which had like to have burned our standing wheat, the day being windy and the fern high. The fire raged with great fury, so that, with the assistance of a great many natives, we had great difficulty in saving the corn, and putting it out. Mr. F. Hall had some barley burned, but not much".

Later that year, Māori plundered the Puckey family's house in a 'Muru' raid, as utu in response for William Gilbert's 11-year-old sister Elizabeth, in response to childish insults being traded, telling the daughter of the great chief Hongi that she would “cut your father's head off, and cook it in the iron pot,” according to Butler's diary. “When the natives broke in, one of them caught hold of him ( WG Puckey) by the hair of his head, and said he would cut off his head if he spoke a word. As soon as he was loosed, in he ran to his father, trembling in every limb.”

Puckey is reported to have later saved the life of a young Māori boy slave who was to be thrown into a river. The missionary suggested he buy the boy from them, and rushed back to the mission station to get the flour and sugar payment negotiated. When he returned, he saw the boy was already in the river. He dived in fully clothed, rescued and revived the boy, who thereafter joined the Puckey household.

A man of ingenuity, Puckey built what may have been New Zealand's first land yacht. He rigged a sail on his dray, which he then 'sailed' back down Ninety Mile Beach after visits and explorations up that beach, letting the horse have an easy run home.

== Impact on Northland ==
During Puckey's lifetime, he influenced and enriched the region of Northland greatly. Because he was a skilled builder, carpenter, inventor and architect, many of Kaitaia's original buildings, bridges and roads were built under his supervision. Tools that he used and created can be seen in the Te Ahu Heritage (Far North Museum).

His fluency in the Māori language meant that he could correctly translate and communicate parts of the Bible into the Māori idiom and language, great assistance for other missionaries and their relations with other Māori communities. Māori converted to Christianity due to Puckey's and his wife's evangelical efforts and example, often spent their life on the mission station, helping to convert other Māori.

== Death and legacy ==
William Gilbert Puckey died at Kaitaia on 27 March 1878, age 73, and was buried at St Saviours Church, Kaitaia. His wife Matilda died on 15 July 1884 in Thames. Some prominent relatives of William Gilbert Puckey include his son Edward Walter Puckey, who was appointed a Judge of the Native Land Court on 18 May 1881.

William and Matilda's 11 children were:

- Frederick James Puckey (1834-1834) died aged seven weeks, at Waimate.
- William George Puckey (1835-1918) m. Margaret Hunt in 1872. Six children.
- Edward Walter Puckey (1837-1924) m. Annie Russell in 1863. Two children.
- Mary Serena Puckey (1839-1927) m. Dr Thomas Trimnell in 1864. Two children.
- Margarita Jane Puckey (1844-1930) m. William Henry Blyth in 1866.
- Caroline Elizabeth Puckey (1842-1849) died from ear infection.
- Frederick Coleman Puckey (1847-1848)
- Charles Iselton Puckey (1848-1934) m. Doris Sophia Subritzky on 14 May 1873. Nine children.
- Richard Henry Martyn Puckey (1852-1934 ) m. Alice Marion masters in 1883. Seven children.
- Annie Matilda Sophia Marella Puckey (1855?-1932?) m. William Temple Williams in 1891. Four children.
- Albert Francis Puckey (1858-1936) m. Gertrude Robinson. No children.

== See also ==
- New Zealand Church Missionary Society

== Other sources ==
- By Bible, Hammer & Compass, Pacific Adventures James and William Puckey, 1796-1827 (2018), Adrienne Puckey, Sean Millar Publishing, Auckland, ISBN 978-1-927329-16-0
- A brief record of the life of William Gilbert Puckey, of New Zealand, missionary and pioneer, A.M.S.M. Williams
- The Story of Paihia (2000), Nancy Pickmere, Calder's Design and Print, Whangarei, ISBN 0-473-06767-6
- Kaitaia and its People (1989), Florence Keene, Allied Graphics, Whangarei, ISBN 0-908817-05-3
- A Lamp Shines in Kerikeri (1969), Nancy Preece Pickmere, News Limited, Kaikohe, NoISBN
- Life of W.G. Puckey (1932), A.M.S.M.Williams.
- Journals and Letters of the Rev. W.G. Puckey, 1831 – 1868, (2004), Special Collections, Auckland Public Library
- Letters From the Bay of Islands: The Story of Marianne Williams, (2004), C Fitzgerald (editor), Penguin Books, Auckland
- Descendants of William Puckey (2007) Family website
