= Herald (1826 ship) =

History

New Zealand
- Name: Herald
- Owner: Church Missionary Society (CMS)
- Builder: CMS personnel
- Laid down: 31 August 1824
- Launched: 24 January 1826
- Completed: 16 February 1826
- Maiden voyage: Bay of Islands to Sydney, Australia February 1826
- Fate: Wrecked on 6 May 1828 while trying to enter Hokianga Harbour.

General characteristics
- Class & type: Schooner
- Tons burthen: 55 (bm)
- Sail plan: fore-and-aft sails
- Crew: 3 Māori men and 3 boys, 2 English seamen, and the mate and the captain

Herald was a 55-ton schooner that was launched on 24 January 1826 at Paihia in the Bay of Islands, New Zealand. While Herald was the first sailing ship built in New Zealand, a small vessel named Providence was constructed in Dusky Sound in 1792–93 by the crew of a sealing ship and it was completed in January 1796 by the crew of another sealing ship that had been wrecked at Dusky Sound in the previous year. In October 1827, the 40-ton schooner Enterprise was completed in the Horeke shipyard (also known as Deptford) in the Hokianga Harbour. Enterprise was wrecked in a storm north of Hokianga Heads on 4 May 1828 with the loss of all hands. Two days later the Herald was wrecked on the Hokianga bar.

== Construction of Herald ==
Herald was built on the authority of the Revd. Samuel Marsden using plans drawn by William Hall. The Revd. Henry Williams, the leader of the Church Missionary Society (CMS) mission in New Zealand, laid the keel for the vessel on 31 August 1824. He had received training in ship-building prior to being sent to New Zealand. Williams needed a ship to provision the Paihia Mission and to visit the more remote areas of New Zealand to bring the Gospel to the Māori people. When Gilbert Mair, visited New Zealand for the third time, Williams asked him to assist in building the Herald. The ship-builders were:

- William Hall, a ship-carpenter;
- William Puckey (Senior) a boatbuilder, mariner and carpenter;
- William Gilbert Puckey, who became the mate of the Herald;
- Gilbert Mair, who became the sailing master of the Herald;
- Māori carpenters also work on the construction of the Herald.

The timber came from the forests at Kawakawa, with the Brampton, which was wrecked in the Bay of Islands in 1823, also providing some timber.

== Voyages ==
Herald went to Sydney, Australia four times and the Bay of Plenty four times. She also sailed three times around the North Cape, to Hokianga Harbour on the west coast of the North Island of New Zealand.

=== Maiden voyage (1826) ===
On 16 February 1826 Herald departed Paihia for Sydney (Port Jackson) to complete her fittings and to obtain a cargo of stores for the mission. On board were a crew of three Māori men and three boys, two English seamen, William Fairburn as supercargo, William Puckey as mate, Gilbert Mair as captain, and Henry Williams. Also on board as passengers, were Mr and Mrs Puckey and their daughter, Rangituke (the son of Ana Hamu and Te Koki, a Ngāpuhi chief) and William Hall, who had become sick.

- 7 March - arrived at Port Jackson.
- 30 May – arrived at Paihia.

=== Second voyage (1826) ===
On 20 June Herald departed Paihia on her first voyage to Tauranga to trade for pork and potatoes for the mission. The passengers were Henry Williams, Richard Davis, George Clarke, James Shepherd, Rangituke and Te Koki. At 9 am on Friday 23 June 1826 Herald became the first European ship to enter Tauranga Harbour. Henry Williams conducted a Christian service at Otamataha Pā.

On 3 July Herald arrived at Paihia.

=== Third voyage (1826) ===
On 19 September Herald departed Paihia for Hokianga. However dangerous seas prevented Herald from entering the harbour.

=== Fourth voyage (1826) ===
On 12 October Herald departed Paihia on her second voyage to Hokianga, arriving on 15 October.

=== Fifth voyage (1826) ===
- 28 November – departed Paihia for Tauranga, to trade for potatoes. Henry Williams and Richard Davis landed on Whakaari / White Island.
- 2 December – arrived at Tauranga and returned to Paihia on 12 December.

=== Sixth voyage (1826–27) ===
- 28 December 1826 – departed Paihia for Port Jackson to obtain stores for the mission.
- 17 January 1827 – at Sydney.
- 15 March 1827 – arrived at Paihia, with stores. (Note: Cargo Manifest: 2 Buts Salt, 2 Barrels Pitch, 1 Ditto Tar, 12 Cases Soap, 1 Ton Sugar, 29 Casks fine Flour, 9 Ditto second do., 1 Hhd. Beer, 2 Casks Axes, I Cask Native Clothing, I Ditto Sundries.)

=== Seventh voyage (1827) ===
- 26 March – departed Paihia for Tauranga. Richard Davis and James Shepherd were sent to trade with the Māori.
- 7 April – arrived Paihia with a cargo of potatoes and some flax.

=== Eighth voyage (1827) ===
- 23 July – departed Paihia for Port Jackson. Richard Davis was sent to arrange the printing of religious texts.
- 8 October – arrived at Paihia with cargo of stores. James Stack was a passenger. Stack was a Wesleyan Methodist missionary who later joined the CMS.

=== Ninth voyage (1827–28) ===
- 19 November – departed Paihia for Port Jackson, arriving 4 December.
- 19 January – arrived Paihia, with the Revd. William Yate as a passenger.

=== Tenth voyage (1828) ===
- 4 April – departed Paihia for the Bay of Plenty to return some Rotorua Māori. The Herald visited Tuhua (Mayor Island). After landing the Rotorua Māori at Maketu, the voyage continued to Whakatāne and Ōpōtiki in the eastern Bay of Plenty. The Herald returned to Tauranga Harbour and anchored off Te Papa where Williams traded with the Māori for potatoes.
- 18 April – arrived at Paihia.

=== Eleventh voyage (1828) ===
- 3 May – departed Paihia for Hokianga Harbour with William Fairburn being sent to trade for potatoes.

== Wreck of the Herald ==
On 6 May 1828 the Herald was wrecked on the Hokianga bar. She had been off the harbour for two days, waiting a favourable opportunity, as a high sea was then running. On the 6th, a little before sunset, she was making for the bar with a fair wind; but, when upon the bar, the wind suddenly failed, and she was left to the power of the breakers, and was carried upon the rocks. The master and the crew clung to the rigging till morning; when the tide allow them to walk ashore – there was no loss of life. The Chief Mate William Lewington, made a statement in 1828, attested by James Norton, giving details of the wreck of the Herald and protesting that it was not due to any neglect of duty.

== Memorial ==
A memorial stone for the Herald was erected on the beach at Paihia.

The Herald appeared on a 5c stamp that was issued by New Zealand Post in 1975.
