= William Yate =

New Zealand missionary and writer (1802–1877)

- Born: 3 November 1802; Bridgnorth, Shropshire, England
- Died: 26 July 1877 (aged 74); Dover, England
- Occupation: Missionary

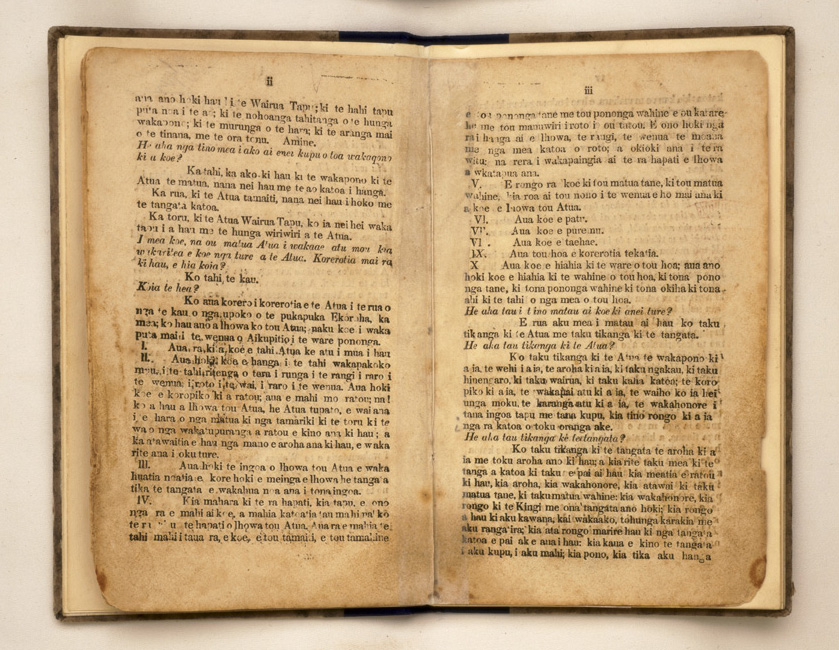
Page ii and iii of Ko te Katihama III, printed by William Yate, 1830

William Yate (3 November 1802 – 26 July 1877) was one of the earliest New Zealand missionaries and writers who worked for the Church Mission Society. He was born in Bridgnorth, Shropshire, England, in 1802. He joined the Church Missionary Society (CMS) and entered the Church Missionary Society College, Islington, London, in 1825. He was ordained as a deacon of the Church of England on 18 December 1825, and priest on 21 May 1826. Yate learned the Māori language and had Christian texts printed in Sydney for his work.

The Revd. Yate arrived in the Bay of Islands, New Zealand, on 19 January 1828 on Herald. He took a small printing press with him and used it to produce a version of the third catechism in Māori, Ko te katihama III. With only a fortnight's training as a printer in Sydney, New South Wales, however, he found the task exasperatingly difficult and attempted nothing further on his press.

In 1830 during Yate's stay in Sydney, he supervised the printing of an edition of 550 copies of translations of the first three chapters of the Book of Genesis, the first eight chapters of the Gospel according to St. Matthew, the first four chapters of the Gospel according to St. John, the first six chapters of the Epistle of St. Paul to the Corinthians, and parts of the Liturgy and Catechism.

In 1830 he was appointed to lead Te Waimate mission, however reports of his sexual encounters with young Māori men became a matter of controversy and he was dismissed from the CMS in June 1834.

== Publications ==
- Yate, William (1835). An Account of New Zealand: And of the Formation and Progress of the Church Missionary Society's Mission in the Northern Island. R.B. Seeley and W. Burnside.
- Yate, William (1843). A letter to the Committee of the Church Missionary Society. John Sydenham, Poole & Bournemouth.
