= Te Waimate Mission =

New Zealand mission station

Coordinates: 35°18′59.59″S 173°52′34.91″E

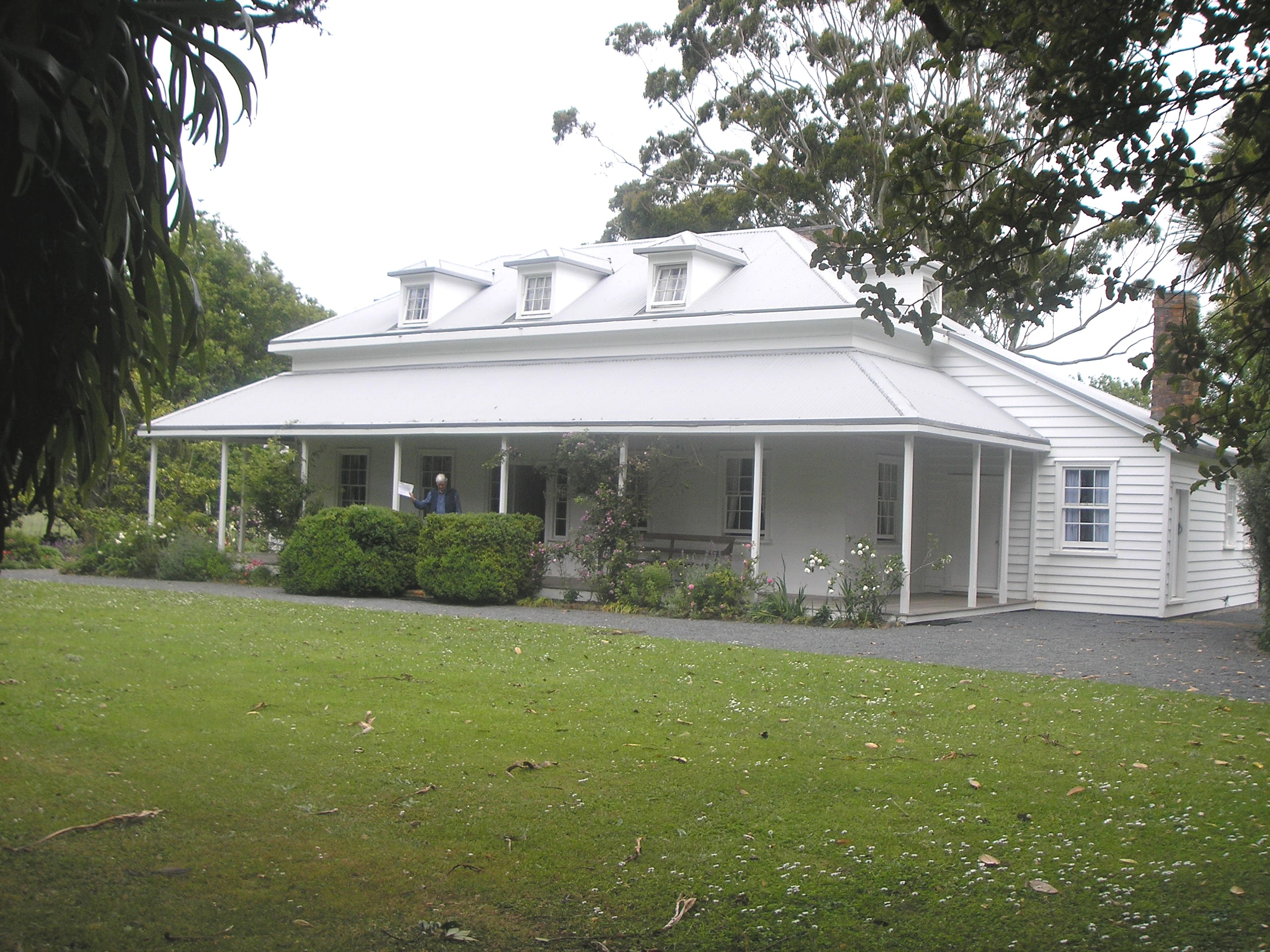
George Clarke's house

Te Waimate Mission was the fourth mission station established in New Zealand and the first settlement inland from the Bay of Islands. The members of the Church Missionary Society (CMS) appointed to establish Te (the) Waimate Mission at Waimate North were the Rev. William Yate and lay members Richard Davis, George Clarke and James Hamlin.

== The early years of Te Waimate Mission ==
At the instigation of Samuel Marsden, a model farming village for Māori was constructed at Te Waimate by the CMS. Land was bought from the Ngāpuhi tribe following the Girls' War of 1830.

In 1830, Richard Davis, farmer and lay member of the CMS, established a farm at the Waimate Mission.

In 1835 William Williams, Jane and their family move to Waimate, where Williams continued his work on the translation of the Bible into Māori. The boarding school for the sons of the CMS missionaries was also transferred from Paihia to Te Waimate Mission. Richard Taylor succeeded William Williams as principal of the Waimate Boys’ School in September 1839.

On 23 & 24 December 1835 Charles Darwin visited when HMS Beagle spent 10 days in the Bay of Islands.

The village comprised three wooden houses for missionary families, a flour mill, printery, carpenters' shop, brickworks, blacksmith, school and of course the church. Marsden hoped Māori would be educated into European culture while making Te Waimate Mission a paying proposition by producing goods for sale to European shipping and the local Māori through the Stone Store at Kerikeri. The attempt to impose European culture on Māori in a controlled fashion where those being taught also formed the labour, failed to attract many Māori and the station was gradually run down.

== St. John the Baptist Church ==
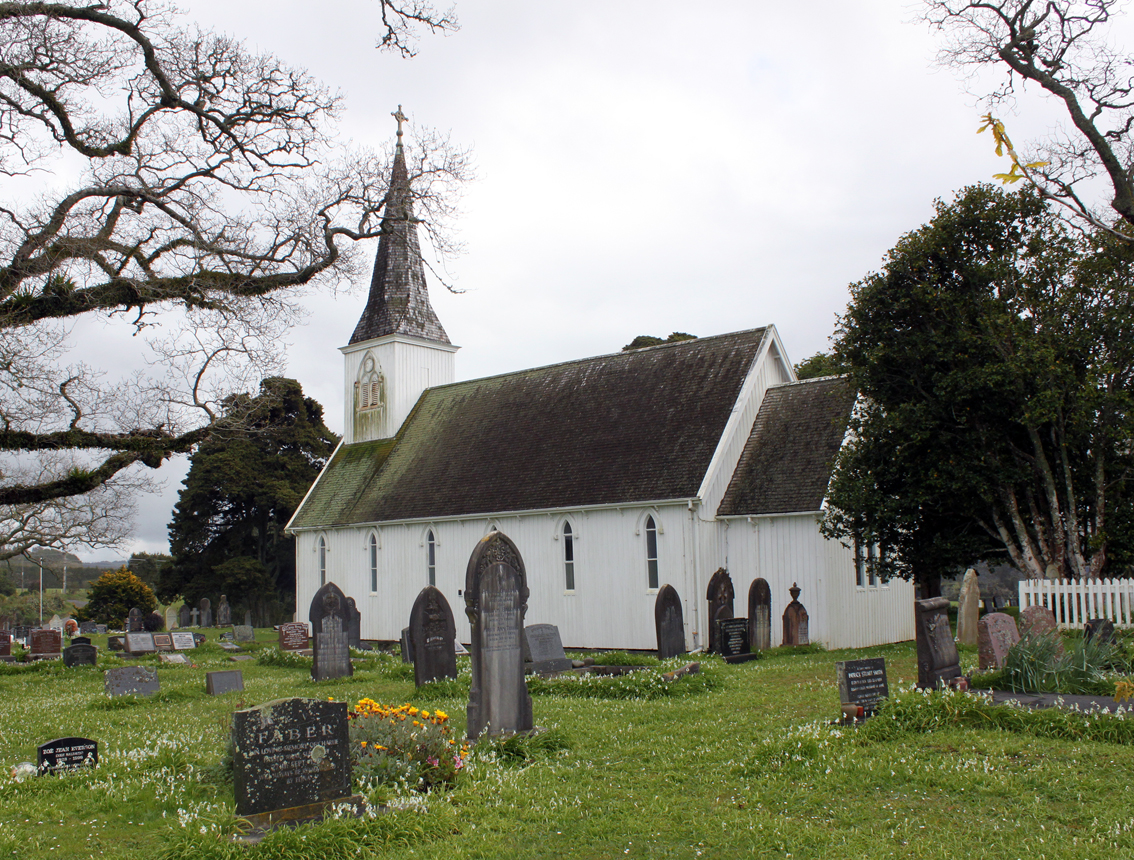
St. John the Baptist Church today. Some combatants who died at the Battle of Ohaeawai in 1845 are buried in this churchyard.

The construction of St. John the Baptist Church was commenced in May 1831 and it was completed in 6 weeks. The name of the church was chosen as St. John the Baptist day fell on 24 June. The original church also served as a school room.

The first child baptised at the church was Edward Blomfield Clarke on 10 July 1831. The first church wedding of two Europeans in New Zealand was conducted on 11 October 1831, between William Gilbert Puckey (26), son of a CMS carpenter, William Puckey, and Matilda Elizabeth Davis (17), second daughter of the Rev. Richard Davis.

The existing St. John the Baptist Church was built in 1871.

== St. John’s College at Te Waimate Mission ==
In June 1842 Bishop George Selwyn set up residence at Te Waimate Mission. Some buildings were converted for use by St. John’s College to teach theology to candidates for ordination into the Anglican Church. The candidates for ordination as deacons were:

- Richard Davis (11 June 1843)
- Seymour Mills Spencer, William Bollard and Henry Francis Butt (24 September 1843)
- William Colenso, Thomas Chapman, James Hamlin, Joseph Matthews and Christopher Pearson Davies (22 September 1844)

On 26 September 1844 Bishop Selwyn presided over the first Synod held in New Zealand. Later in 1844 Bishop Selwyn moved his residence and St John’s College to Auckland.

== Te Waimate Mission after 1845 ==
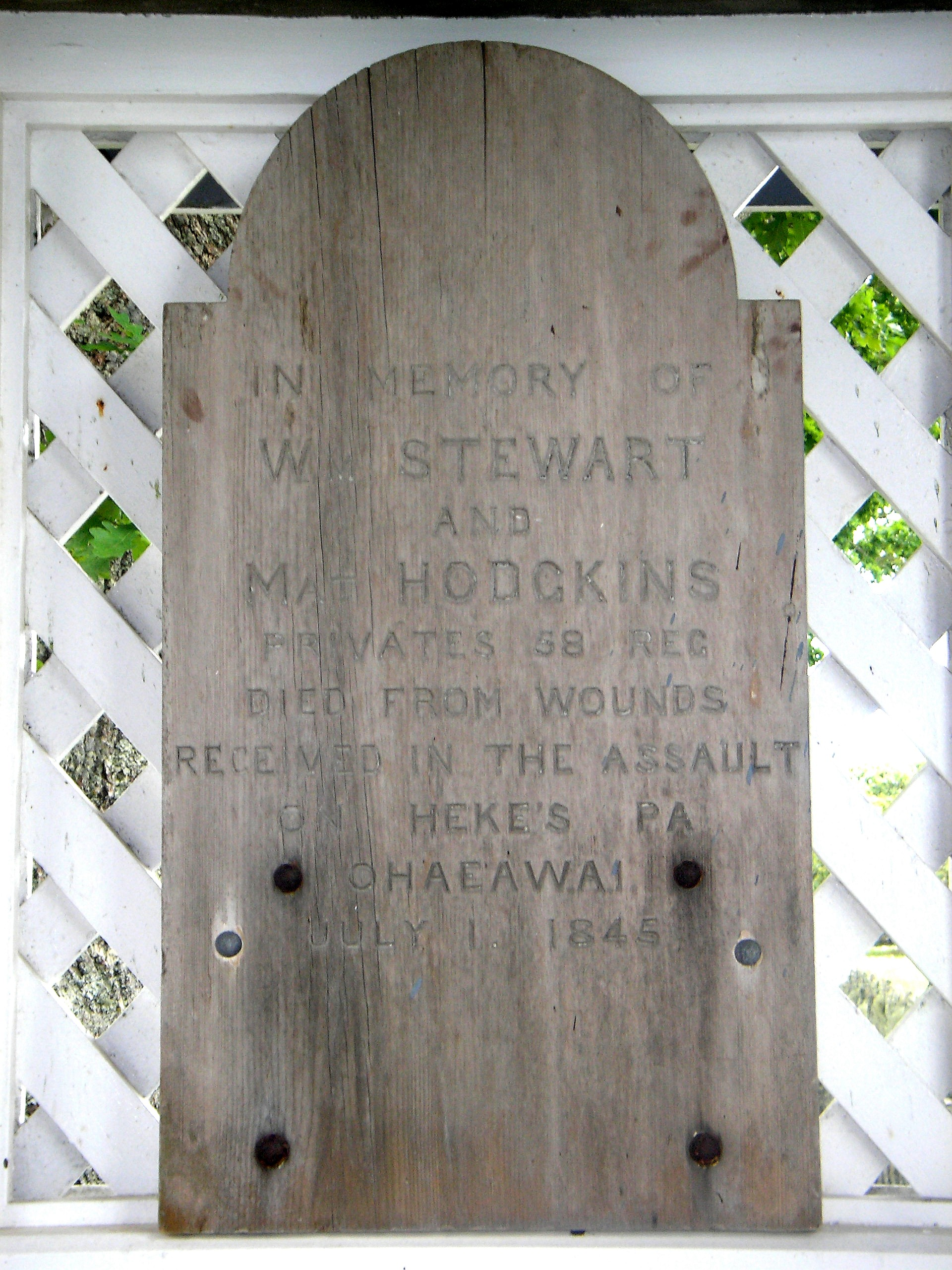
Wooden headstone for two of the British soldiers killed at Ohaeawai, preserved at the mission

During the Flagstaff War soldiers from the 58th and 99th Regiments, casualties of the Battle of Ohaeawai (July 1845), were buried in the graveyard of St. John the Baptist Church, including Captain Grant of the 58th Regiment, and Lieutenant George Phillpotts of HMS Hazard. The mission station was used as the headquarters for the British army from 15 June 1845 to 6 October 1845, after which the mission lost support among the Māori. The mission station gradually fell into disrepair and the buildings were subsequently put up for sale.

Today the only remnant on the site is the house originally occupied by George Clarke, which is preserved by Heritage New Zealand as a museum. One of the other houses survives at the Butler Point Whaling Museum. A third building was sold and moved to Kerikeri- located on Springbank Lane it is occupied to this day as a home.

== CMS members appointed to Te Waimate Mission ==
The members of the Church Missionary Society who were appointed to Te Waimate Mission include:

- William Yate, arrived in the Bay of Islands on 19 January 1828. In 1830 he was appointed to lead Te Waimate Mission, however his personal life became a matter of controversy and he was dismissed from the CMS in June 1834.
- George Clarke arrived in the Bay of Islands on 4 April 1824. He was first appointed to Kerikeri to work as a blacksmith, and later worked at Te Waimate Mission from 1830 to 1840 teaching the Māori students.
- Richard Davis, a farmer, arrived in the Bay of Islands on 7 May 1824. In 1830 he established a farm at the Waimate Mission and remained there until 1845. He was ordained on Trinity Sunday 1843. He was appointed to Kaikohe from 1845 to 1854, then he returned to Te Waimate Mission from 1854 to 1863.
- William Gilbert Puckey worked at Te Waimate Mission, then in 1834 he established the Kaitaia Mission. As he had become fluent in the language since arriving as a boy of 14, he was a useful translator for the CMS mission, including collaborating with William Williams on the translation of the New Testament in 1837 and its revision in 1844.
- James Hamlin, flax dresser and weaver, arrived in the Bay of Islands on 25 March 1826 with his wife Elizabeth on the same ship as William Williams and Jane Williams. He served as a catechist at Te Waimate Mission from 1830 to 1834. In 1834 Hamlin left to establish a mission station at Puriri (in Thames).
- William Williams moved to Te Waimate Mission in 1835, became the principal of the Waimate Boys’ School and continued his work on the translation of the Bible into Māori. In December 1839 Williams, his wife and their family left Waimate to establish the Poverty Bay Mission at Tūranga.
- Richard Taylor, arrived in the Bay of Islands in 1839. He was appointed as head of the school at Te Waimate Mission in 1839 and remained there until 1842. In 1842 Taylor moved to join the mission station at Whanganui.
- William Colenso, arrived in December 1834 to work as a printer at Paihia. In 1843 Colenso went to Te Waimate Mission to study for ordination. Ordained a deacon in 1844 Colenso was appointed to open a new mission station at Ahuriri, at Napier.
- Robert Maunsell arrived at Te Waimate Mission in 1835 and he was sent to established the Manukau mission station that same year. Maunsell became a leading scholar of the Māori language. After 1844 he worked with William Williams on the revision of the translation of the Bible. He revised the translation of the Old Testament into the Māori language, portions of which were published in 1840 with the full translation completed in 1857.
- Robert Burrows, was appointed to St. John the Baptist Church in 1844 and remained at Te Waimate Mission until 1854.
- Henry Williams, the Archdeacon of Te Waimate (1844–1867).
- Edward Blomfield Clarke, the son of George Clarke was appointed to St. John the Baptist Church (1863–1884); he then became the Archdeacon of Te Waimate (1870–1901).
