= Robert Maunsell (missionary) =

Irish-born New Zealand missionary (1810–1894)

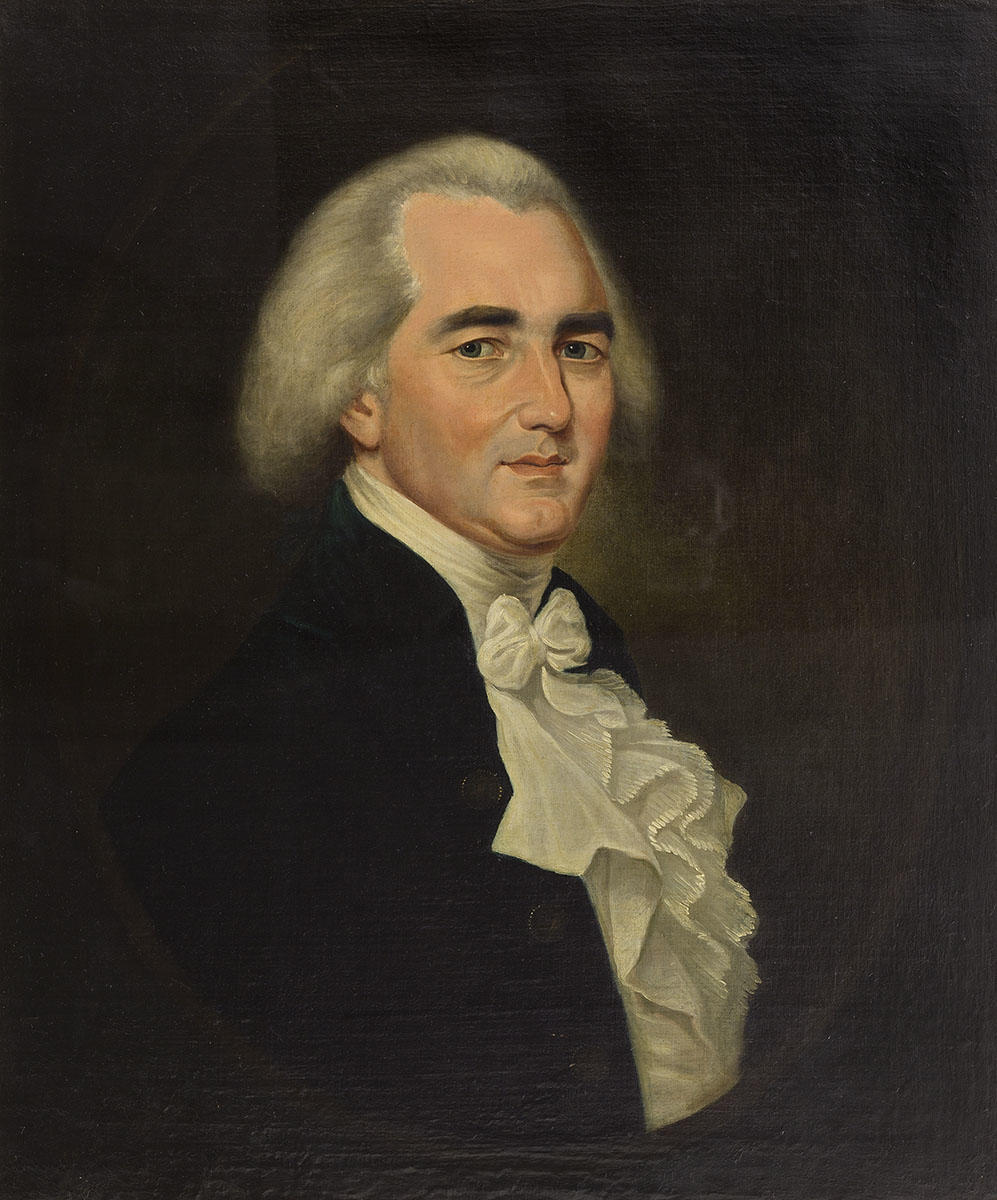
- Born: 24 October 1810; Milford, near Limerick, Ireland
- Died: 19 April 1894 (aged 83); Parnell, New Zealand
- Occupation: Missionary
- Spouse: Susan Cherry Pigott

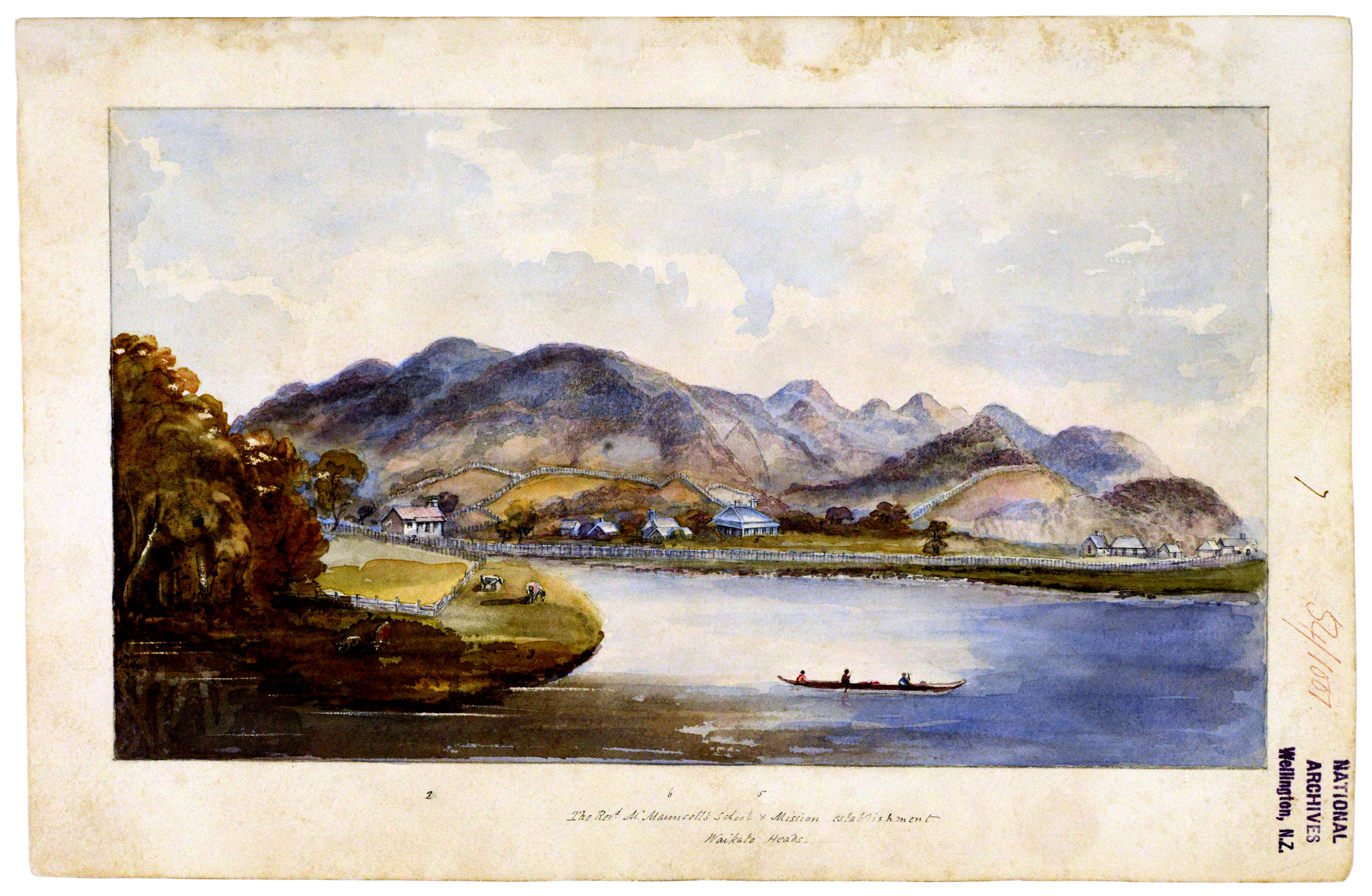
Maunsell's home and mission station, Waikato Heads, painted in 1854 probably by Francis Dillon Bell

Robert Maunsell (24 October 1810 – 19 April 1894) was a New Zealand missionary, linguist and translator. He was born in Milford, near Limerick, Ireland on 24 October 1810.

== Life ==
Robert Maunsell joined the Church Missionary Society and arrived in the Bay of Islands in 1835 and was appointed to Te Waimate mission, and he was sent to established the Manukau mission station that same year; where he operated a school. From 1849 to 1865 he worked at Te Kohanga Mission near Port Waikato, including during the Invasion of the Waikato, which was the response of the colonial government to the Kingitanga Movement.

After 1844 the Rev. Robert Maunsell worked with William Williams on the revision of the translation of the Bible into the Māori language. William Williams concentrated on the revision of the New Testament; Maunsell worked on the revision of the Old Testament, portions of which were published in 1840 with the full translation completed in 1857.

In 1845 the Book of Common Prayer was translated by a committee comprising William Williams, Robert Maunsell, James Hamlin and William Puckey.

He was Archdeacon of Waitemata from 1868 to 1870; and then Archdeacon of Auckland until 1883.

He died on 19 April 1894 at Parnell, New Zealand.

== Relevant literature ==
- Garrett, Helen. 1991. Te Manihera: The life and Times of the Pioneer Missionary Robert Maunsell. Auckland: Reed.
