= Early New Zealand Books =

Database by the University of Auckland

Early New Zealand Books (ENZB) is a project from the library of the University of Auckland, New Zealand, launched in 2005, that aims at providing keyword-searchable text of significant books published about New Zealand in the first two-thirds of the nineteenth century. It also includes the subsequently published memoirs, journals and correspondence of people active in this era. The project has been funded and managed by the University of Auckland Library and has been freely available on the internet.

Each page is linked to an image of that page from the original book. This provides researchers with assurance of accuracy. There are special searches for captions to illustrations and chapter summaries as well as a general full-text search across the whole corpus. The images are available at original size and extra-large. Books are also available as downloadable ePub ebooks. It is one of a number of projects at the University of Auckland library that use the b-engine rendering engine. In February 2015 three hundred and twenty-seven volumes have been digitized. Twenty-seven were contributed by Auckland Libraries and twenty-four by the Auckland War Memorial Museum.

It is distinct from a similar collection of digitized older New Zealand publications, viz. the New Zealand Electronic Text Collection from Victoria University of Wellington.

It does not include the rarest early New Zealand book A History of the Birds of New Zealand by ornithologist Walter Buller and plates by the artist J.G. Keulemans.

== List of books ==
Key works highlighted.

- 1807 – Savage, John. Some Account Of New Zealand
- 1817–1853 – The Missionary Register [Sections relating to New Zealand. Missing most of 1836–1843, 1848]
- 1830, 1831, 1832, 1834, 1835, 1837, 1843, 1850, 1854, 1855 – Church Missionary Record [Sections relating to New Zealand only]
- 1817 – Nicholas, J. L. Narrative of a Voyage to New Zealand [Vol.I]
- 1817 – Nicholas, J. L. Narrative of a Voyage to New Zealand [Vol.II]
- 1824 – Cruise, R. Journal of a Ten Months' Residence in New Zealand [2nd ed.][Capper 1974]
- 1829 – Dillon, P. Narrative and Successful Result of a Voyage... Vol. I. [Selected chs.]
- 1829 – Dillon, P. Narrative and Successful Result of a Voyage... Vol. II. [Selected chs.]
- 1831 – Tyerman, D. Journal of Voyages and Travels... Vol. II. [One chapter]
- 1832 – Busby, J. Authentic Information relative to New South Wales and New Zealand
- 1832 – Earle, A. A Narrative of a Nine Months' Residence in New Zealand, in 1827
- 1832 – Morrell, B. A narrative of Four Voyages... [Fourth Voyage, Chapters 2 and 3]
- 1830 – Craik, George L. The New Zealanders
- 1834 – MacDonell, Thomas. Extracts from Mr. M'Donnell's MS Journal
- 1835 – Yate, William. An Account Of New Zealand [2nd ed.]
- 1836 – Report of the Formation and Establishment of the New Zealand Temperance Society
- 1836 – Marshall, W. B. A Personal Narrative of Two Visits to New Zealand
- 1838? – Description of a view of the Bay of Islands, New Zealand, and the surrounding country
- 1838 – Beecham, J. Remarks Upon the Latest Official Documents Relating to New Zealand.
- 1838 – Hinds, Samuel. The latest Official Documents relating to New Zealand
- 1838 – Polack, J. S. New Zealand [Vol.I] [Capper reprint, 1974]
- 1838 – Polack, J. S. New Zealand [Vol.II] [Capper reprint, 1974]
- 1839 – Darwin, Charles. Journal of Researches into the Geology and Natural History of the Various Countries Visited by H.M.S. Beagle. [Chapter XX only] [ Brussels: Editions Culture et Civilisation, 1969]
- 1839 – Fitzroy, R. Narrative of the Surveying Voyages of His Majesty's ships Adventure and Beagle [New Zealand chapters] [New York: AMS, 1966].
- 1839 – Lang, John Dunmore. New Zealand in 1839: or Four Letters to the Right Hon. Earl Durham on the Colonization of that Island.
- 1839 – Walton, John. Twelve Months Residence in New Zealand
- 1839 – White, William. Important Information Relative to New Zealand
- 1840 – Campbell, E. The Present State, Resources and Prospects of New Zealand
- 1840 – Hawtrey, Montague J. G. An Earnest Address to New Zealand Colonists, with Reference to their Intercourse with the Native Inhabitants.
- 1840 – Johnson, J. Pitts. Plain Truths, Told by a Traveller [New Zealand sections
- 1840 – Missions of the Church Missionary Society at Kishnaghur and in New Zealand [New Zealand Section Only]
- 1840 – Polack, J. S. Manners and Customs of the New Zealanders [Vol. I.] [Capper reprint, 1976]
- 1840 – Polack, J. S. Manners and Customs of the New Zealanders [Capper reprint, 1976]
- 1840 – Rudge, J. An Address to the New Zealand Emigrants]
- 1840 – Ward J. Supplementary Information Relative to New Zealand
- 1841 – Bidwill, J. Rambles in New Zealand [Capper facsimile, 1974]
- 1841 – Bright, John. Handbook for Emigrants and Others
- 1841 – Franklin, Jane. Letter from Lady Franklin to Sir John Franklin. Australian Historical Monographs New Series, Vol. 18, Part II, 1977
- 1841 – Hodgskin, R. A Narrative of Eight Months' Sojourn in New Zealand
- 1842 – Fox, William. Colonization and New Zealand
- 1842 – Mangles, R. How to Colonise
- 1842 – Petre, H. W. An Account of the Settlements of the New Zealand Company [5th ed.][Capper 1971]
- 1842 – Ritter, Carl. Die Colonisation von Neu-Seeland
- 1842 – Wade, William A Journey in the Northern Island of New Zealand
- 1842 – Latest Information from the Settlement of New Plymouth
- 1842 – Heaphy, C. Narrative of a Residence in Various Parts of New Zealand [Hocken 1970]
- 1842 – Ward, J. Nelson, the Latest Settlement of the New Zealand Company
- 1842 – Terry, Charles. New Zealand: its Advantages and Prospects as a British Colony
- 1842 – Jameson, R. G. New Zealand, South Australia and New South Wales [Part]
- 1843 – Chapman, H. The New Zealand Portfolio
- 1843 – Letters from Settlers and Labouring Emigrants
- 1843 – Dieffenbach, Ernest. Travels in New Zealand [Vol.I] [Capper reprint, 1974]
- 1843 – Dieffenbach, Ernest. Travels in New Zealand [Vol.II] [Capper reprint, 1974]
- 1843 – Jennings, J. New Zealand Colonization
- 1843 – Russell, Michael. Polynesia; or an Historical Account of the Principal Islands in the South Sea [New Zealand Chapter Only]
- 1843 – Selwyn, George Augustus. New Zealand Mission: Views of the Bishop of New Zealand.
- 1844 – Burns, Barnet. A Brief Narrative of a New Zealand Chief [Hocken Library facsim. 1970]
- 1844 – Coates, D. The New Zealanders and their Lands
- 1844 – Colenso, W. Excursion in the Northern Island of New Zealand
- 1845 – Brodie, W. Remarks on the Past and Present State of New Zealand
- 1845 – Churton, Henry. Letters from Wanganui, New Zealand
- 1845 – Great Britain Parliament. House of Commons, A corrected report of the debate in the House of Commons
- 1845 – Martin, S. M. New Zealand: in a Series of Letters
- 1845 – Scheme of the Colony of the Free Church at Otago
- 1845 – Wakefield, E.J. Adventure in New Zealand [Vol.I.]
- 1845 – Wakefield, E. J. Adventure in New Zealand [Vol.II.]
- 1845 – Wilkes, C. Narrative of the United States Exploring Expedition Vol. II. [Part only]
- 1845 – Williams, W. Three Letters Addressed to the Right Hon. the Earl of Chichester Relative to the Charges Brought Against the New Zealand Mission
- 1846 – Aborigines Protection Society. On the British Colonization of New Zealand.
- 1846 – The Auckland Pocket Almanack for the Year 1847
- 1846 – Fitzroy, Robert. Remarks on New Zealand: in February 1846
- 1846 – Marjoribanks, A. Travels in New Zealand
- 1847 – Angas, G. F. The New Zealanders [Reed facsim., 1966]
- 1847 – Angas, G. F. Savage Life and Scenes in Australia and New Zealand [Vol I.]
- 1847 – Angas, G. F. Savage Life and Scenes in Australia and New Zealand Vol.II
- 1847 – Grimstone, S. E. The Southern Settlements of New Zealand.
- 1847 – Plain Facts Relative to the Late War in the Northern District of New Zealand
- 1847 – Ross, J. C. A Voyage of Discovery and Research in the Southern and Antarctic Regions [New Zealand Chapters Only].
- 1847 – Selwyn, G. Annals of the Diocese of New Zealand
- 1848 – An Account of the Earthquakes in New Zealand
- 1847 – Selwyn, G. England and the New Zealanders, Part I
- 1848 – Arrangements for the Adjustment of Questions Relating to Land in the Settlements of the New Zealand Company.
- 1848 – Byrne, J. C. Twelve Years' Wanderings in the British Colonies [New Zealand sections]
- 1848 – Chamerovzow, L. A. The New Zealand Question
- 1848 – Correspondence Between the Wesleyan Missionary Committee and the Rt. Hon. Earl Grey
- 1849 – Brees, S. C. Pictorial Illustrations of New Zealand
- 1849–1850, 1857 – Church Missionary Intelligencer [Sections relating to New Zealand]
- 1849 – Fox, William. Report on the Settlement of Nelson in New Zealand
- 1849 – Hursthouse, C. An Account of the Settlement of New Plymouth
- 1849 – McKillop, H. F. Reminiscences of Twelve Months' in New Zealand [Fac. ed. Capper, 1973]
- 1849 – Power, W. T. Sketches in New Zealand
- 1850? – Brees, S. C. Guide and Description of the Panorama of New Zealand
- 1850 – Mantell, G. A. Notice of the Remains of the Dinornis and Other Birds...
- 1851 – Brown, William. New Zealand and its Aborigines [2nd ed.]
- 1851 – Burton, J. H. The Emigrant's Manual. New Zealand, Cape of Good Hope and Port Natal [NZ sections only]
- 1851 – Cooper, G. S. Journal of an Expedition Overland from Auckland to Taranaki
- 1847–1851. Selwyn, G. A. New Zealand
- 1851 – Fox, William. The Six Colonies of New Zealand
- 1851 – Hursthouse, C. New Zealand: the Emigration Field of 1851.
- 1851 – Lucett, E. Rovings in the Pacific, from 1837 to 1849 [New Zealand sections]
- 1851 – Shortland, E. The Southern Districts of New Zealand: A Journal, with Passing Notices of the Customs of the Aborigines.
- 1852 – Barrett, A. The Life of the Rev. John Hewgill Bumby
- 1852 – Defoe, D. He Korero Tipuna Pakeha no Mua, ko Ropitini Kuruho tona Ingoa
- 1852 – Gann, A. J. The New Zealand Emigration Circular for 1852
- 1852 – Martin, A. Journal of an Emigrant from Dorsetshire to New Zealand. [Typescript]
- 1852 – Mundy, G. C. Our Antipodes. [Vol. II.]
- 1852 – Peppercorne, F. S. Geological and Topographical Sketches of the Province of New Ulster
- 1852 – Rough, David. Narrative of a Journey through Part of the North of New Zealand
- 1852 – Rules and Regulations of the Constabulary Force of New Zealand
- 1852 – Shaw, John. A Tramp to the Diggings [New Zealand sections only]
- 1853 – Adams, C. W. A Spring in the Canterbury Settlement
- 1853 – Collinson, T. B. Remarks on the Military Operations in New Zealand
- 1853 – Earp, G. B. New Zealand: Its Emigration and Gold Fields
- 1853 – Grey, H. G. The Colonial Policy of Lord John Russell's Administration. [New Zealand chapters]
- 1853 – New Zealand and its Six Colonies Historically and Geographically Described.
- 1853 – Rochfort, J. The Adventures of a Surveyor in New Zealand... [Capper reprint, 1974]
- 1853 – Swainson, William. Auckland, the Capital of New Zealand
- 1854 – Cholmondeley, T. Ultima Thule
- 1854 – Golder, W. The Pigeons' Parliament
- 1854 – Grey, George. Memorandum upon a Letter addressed by Lord Lyttelton...
- 1854 – Malone, R. E. Three Years' Cruise in the Australasian Colonies [NZ sections only]
- 1854 – Richardson, J. The First Christian Martyr of the New Zealand Church
- 1854 – Richardson, J. A Summer's Excursion in New Zealand
- 1854 – Selfe, H. S. – The Accounts of the Canterbury Association, with Explanatory Remarks, in a Letter to Lord Lyttelton
- 1854 – Young, Robert. The Southern World [New Zealand sections only]
- 1855 – Davis, C. O. Maori Mementos...[and a] Collection of Laments...
- 1855 – Davis, C. O. The Renowned Chief Kawiti and other New Zealand Warriors
- 1855 – Taylor, Richard. Te Ika a Maui
- 1855 – Tucker, S. The Southern Cross and Southern Crown
- 1856 – Brown, A. N. Brief Memorials of an Only Son [2nd ed.]
- 1856 – Busby, J. The First Settlers in New Zealand and their Treatment by the Government
- 1856 – Fitton, Edward. New Zealand: its Present Condition, Prospects and Resources
- 1856 – New Zealand Pilot
- 1856 – The New Zealand Church Almanac, for the Year of Our Lord 1856
- 1856 – Shortland, Edward. Traditions and Superstitions of the New Zealanders
- 1856 – White, J. Maori Superstitions
- 1857 – Askew, J. A Voyage to Australia and New Zealand [New Zealand sections]
- 1857 – Baker, A. New Zealand compared with Great Britain in its Physical and Social Aspects
- 1857 – Busby, James. Colonies and Colonization.
- 1857 – Busby, James. A letter to His Excellency Colonel Thomas Gore Browne
- 1857 – Cooper, I. R. The New Zealand Settler's Guide
- 1857 – Dewes, J. China, Australia and the Pacific Islands in the Years, 1855–56. [Chap VII only]
- 1857 – Domestic Scenes in New Zealand. [First ed. was 1845]
- 1857 – Hursthouse, C. New Zealand, or Zealandia, the Britain of the South [Vol.I.]
- 1857 – Hursthouse, C. New Zealand, or Zealandia, the Britain of the South [Vol.II.]
- 1857 – Nordhoff, C. Stories of the Island World [New Zealand chapter]
- 1857 – Paul, R. B. Letters from Canterbury, New Zealand
- 1858 – Moon, H. An Account of the Wreck of H.M. Sloop "Osprey"
- 1858 – Puseley, Daniel. The Rise and Progress of Australia, Tasmania, and New Zealand. [New Zealand Chapters Only]
- [1858 – Smith, S. P. An 1858 Journey into the Interior [Published 1953]]
- 1859 – Busby, J. The Pre-emption Land Question
- 1859 – Fenton, F. D. Observations on the State of the Aboriginal Inhabitants of New Zealand
- 1859 – Fuller, F. Five Years' Residence in New Zealand
- 1859 – Swainson, William. New Zealand and its Colonization
- 1859 – Thomson, A. S. The Story of New Zealand [Vol.I]
- 1859 – Thomson, A. S. The Story of New Zealand [Vol.II]
- 1859 – Willox, J. Willox's New Zealand Hand Book
- 1859 – Wilson, E. Rambles at the Antipodes [Part only]
- 1860 – Bell, F. D. Notes by the Governor on Sir William Martin's Pamphlet entitled The Taranaki Question
- 1860 – Busby, J. Remarks upon a Pamphlet entitled 'The Taranaki Question...'
- 1860 – Browne, E. H. The Case of the War in New Zealand
- 1860 – Chapman's New Zealand Almanac
- 1860 – Hadfield, O. One of England's Little Wars
- 1860 – Johnston, A. Notes on Maori Matters.
- 1860 – Voices from Auckland
- 1860 – Weld, F. A. Hints to Intending Sheep-Farmers in New Zealand
- 1861 – Bunbury, T. Reminiscences of a Veteran [New Zealand chapters]
- 1861 – Church Missionary Society. Memorial to His Grace, The Secretary of State for the Colonies...
- 1861 – Gilbert, T. New Zealand Settlers and Soldiers or The War in Taranaki
- 1861 – Hadfield, O. A Sequel to 'One of England's Little Wars'
- 1861 – Hadfield, O. The New Zealand War: the Second Year of one of England's Little Wars
- 1861 – Hawtrey, M. Justice to New Zealand, Honour to England
- 1861 – Martin, W. The Taranaki Question. 3rd ed.
- 1862 – Grayling, W. I. The War in Taranaki, during the years 1860–1861
- 1862 – Maning, F. E. History of the War in the North of New Zealand
- 1862 – Marjouram, W. Memorials of Sergeant William Marjouram
- 1862 – Swainson, W. New Zealand and the War
- 1862 – Ward, R. Lectures from New Zealand
- 1863 – Alexander, J. Incidents of the Maori War
- 1863 – Butler, S. A First Year in Canterbury Settlement.
- 1863 – Carey, R. Narrative of the Late War in New Zealand
- 1863 – Heywood, B. A. A Vacation Tour at the Antipodes [Chapters 3–5 and Appendix and NZ Map]
- 1863? – von Hochstetter, F. Hochstetter's Atlas.
- 1863 – Hodder, Edwin. Memories of New Zealand Life. 2nd ed.
- 1863 – Maning, Frederick. Old New Zealand
- 1863 – Scherzer, K. Narrative of the Circumnavigation... by the Austrian Frigate, Novara [Ch. XIX]
- 1863 – Settler. The Waikato and Ngaruawahia, the Proposed New Capital of New Zealand
- 1863 – Stones, W. New Zealand, the Land of Promise, and its Resources
- 1863 – Wakefield, E. J. What will they do in the General Assembly?
- 1864 – Gorst, J.E. The Maori king
- 1864 – von Hochstetter, Ferdinand. The Geology of New Zealand
- 1864 – Muter, E. Travels and Adventures of an Officer's Wife in India, China and New Zealand. [NZ Sections only]
- 1864 – Partridge, C. Calumny Refuted, the Colonists Vindicated...
- 1864 – Sewell, H. The New Zealand Rebellion
- 1864 – The New Zealand Government and the Maori War of 1863–64.
- 1865 – Alexander, J. Notes on the Maories of New Zealand
- 1865 – Davis, R. A Memoir of the Rev. Richard Davis
- 1865 – Puna, Aterea. Letters on the Present State of Maori Affairs
- 1865 – Shortland, E. A Short Sketch of the Maori Races.
- 1866 – Angas, G. F. Polynesia [Selected chapters relating to NZ]
- 1866 – Busby, J. Our Colonial Empire and the Case of New Zealand
- 1866 – Carter, C. R. Life and Recollections of a New Zealand Colonist Vol. II . [New Zealand sections only]
- 1866 – Fox, W. The War in New Zealand
- 1866 – Hector, J. First General Report on the Coal Deposits of New Zealand
- 1866 – Hunt, F. Twenty-five Years' Experience in New Zealand and the Chatham Islands
- 1866 – Mitchell and Seffern's Directory of the City and Suburbs of Auckland, for 1866-7.
- 1866 – The New Zealand Handbook (11th ed.)
- 1867 – Cooper, T. A Digger's Diary at the Thames, 1867 [Hocken 1978]
- 1867? – Hutton, F. W. Geological report on the Lower Waikato District
- 1867? – Hutton, F. W. Geological Report on the Thames Gold Fields
- 1867 – Moillet, J. K. The Mary Ira
- 1867 – Taylor, R. Our Race and its Origin.
- 1867 – Thomson, J. T. Rambles with a Philosopher
- 1867? – Thomson, Mrs. Twelve Years in Canterbury New Zealand
- 1867 – Williams, William. Christianity among the New Zealanders
- 1867 – von Hochstetter, Ferdinand. New Zealand
- 1868 – Hector, J. Abstract Report on the Progress of the Geological Survey of New Zealand during 1866–67
- 1868 – The History of Local Government in New Zealand
- 1868? – Hursthouse, C. 'New Zealand Wars': a Letter to the Times
- 1868 – Liverpool, C. Foljambe, Earl of. Three Years on the Australian Station
- 1868 – Richardson, J. L. C. Our Constitutional History
- 1868 – The Thames Miners Guide
- 1868 – Williams, T. C. New Zealand, the Manawatu Purchase Completed
- 1869 – Bowden, T A. Manual of New Zealand Geography
- 1869 – Hawthorne, J. A Dark Chapter from New Zealand History. [Capper reprint 1974]
- 1869 – May, J. Guide to Farming in New Zealand.
- 1869 – McDonnell, Thomas. An Explanation of the Principal Causes which led to the Present War on the West Coast of New Zealand.
- 1869 – The Taranaki Almanac and Directory.
- 1870 – Frere, A. The Antipodes and Round the World [New Zealand chapters]
- 1870 – Grey, G. Polynesian Ethnology.
- 1870 – Meade, H. A Ride through the Disturbed Districts of New Zealand. [Chapters I-VI].
- 1870 – Strachan, A. The Life of the Rev Samuel Leigh
- 1871 – Haast, J. von. Moas and Moa Hunters
- 1871 – Money, C. L. Knocking About in New Zealand [Capper reprint, 1972]
- 1872 – Turner, J. G. The Pioneer Missionary
- 1872 – Ward, R. Life among the Maories of New Zealand
- 1873 – Alexander, J. Bush Fighting
- 1873 – Barker, M. A. Station Amusements in New Zealand.
- 1873 – Kennedy, A. New Zealand
- 1873 – The Province of Canterbury, New Zealand: Information for Intending Emigrants.
- 1873 – St. John, J. H. A. Pakeha Rambles through Maori Lands
- 1873 – Tinne, J. Ernest. The Wonderland of the Antipodes
- 1873 – Trollope, Anthony. Australia and New Zealand [New Zealand Chapters Only]
- 1874 – Adam, J. Twenty-five Years of Emigrant Life in the South of New Zealand
- 1874 – Baines, W M. The Narrative of Edward Crewe, or Life in New Zealand
- 1874 – Bathgate, A. Colonial Experiences or Sketches of People and Places in the Province of Otago, New Zealand.
- 1874 – Carleton, H. The Life of Henry Williams, [Vol. I.]
- 1874 – Kennaway, L. J. Crusts: A Settler's Fare due South. [Capper reprint, 1970]
- 1875 – Carter, C. R. Life and Recollections of a New Zealand Colonist. Vol. III. [NZ sections only]
- 1875 – Mundy, D. L. Rotomahana and the Boiling Springs of New Zealand: A Photographic Series of Sixteen Views.
- 1876 – Davis, C. O. The Life and Times of Patuone
- 1877 – Carleton, H. The Life of Henry Williams [Vol. II.]
- 1877 – Firth, Josiah Clifton. Lectures on Lions in the Way and Luck.
- 1877 – Pratt, W. T. Colonial Experiences
- 1877 – Wakelin, R. History and Politics
- 1878 – Buller, James. Forty years in New Zealand
- 1878 – M'Indoe, J. A Sketch of Otago, from the Initiation of the Settlement to the Abolition of the Province
- 1878 – Wells, B. The History of Taranaki
- 1879 – Featon, J. The Waikato War, 1863–64
- 1879 – Gudgeon, T. W. Reminiscences of the War in New Zealand
- 1879 – Innes, C. L. Canterbury Sketches or Life from the Early Days
- 1879 – Tucker, H. W. Memoir of the Life and Episcopate of George Augustus Selwyn [Vol.I]
- 1879 – Tucker, H. W. Memoir of the Life and Episcopate of George Augustus Selwyn [Vol.II]
- 1880 – Crawford, J. C. Recollections of Travel in New Zealand and Australia
- 1881 – Campbell, John Logan. Poenamo
- 1883 – Rusden, G. W. History of New Zealand Vol.I.
- 1884 – Colenso, W. An Account of Visits to, and Crossings over, the Ruahine Mountain Range
- 1884 – Cox, A. Recollections
- 1884 – Lady Martin. Our Maoris
- 1885 – Dilke, C. W. Greater Britain: A Record of Travel in English-Speaking Countries. 8th ed.
- 1885 – Gudgeon, T. W. The History and Doings of the Maoris: From the Year 1820 to the Signing of the Treaty of Waitangi in 1840.
- 1885 – White, John. Maori Customs and Superstitions [Lectures from 1861]
- 1886 – Burrows, R. Extracts from a Diary kept by the Rev. R. Burrows during Heke's War...
- 1887 – Gudgeon, T. W. The Defenders of New Zealand
- 1887 – McDonnell, T. A Maori History of the War
- 1887 – McDonnell, T. Incidents of the War. Tales of Maori Character and Customs
- 1887 – Mackay, J. Our Dealings with Maori lands
- 1887 – Pyke, V. History of the Early Gold Discoveries in Otago
- 1888 – Pompallier, J. Early History of the Catholic Church in Oceania
- 1888 – Barlow, P. W. Kaipara
- 1888 – Colenso, William. Fifty Years Ago in New Zealand
- 1888 – Moser, T. Mahoe Leaves
- 1888 – Te Paerata, H. Description of the Battle of Orakau
- 1889 – Wilson, J. A. Missionary Life and Work in New Zealand
- 1890 – Colenso, W. The Authentic and Genuine History of the Signing of the Treaty of Waitangi [Capper reprint]
- 1890? – McDonnell, Thomas. General Chute's campaign on the West Coast.
- 1891 – Crozet, Julien Marie. Crozet's Voyage to Tasmania, New Zealand...[trans. H. Ling Roth]
- 1893 – Fergusson, Dugald. Bush Life in Australia and New Zealand. [Chapters 28–46].
- 1893 – MacKenzie, F. W. Overland from Auckland to Wellington in 1853
- 1895 – Wohlers, J. F. H. Memories of the Life of J.F.H. Wohlers
- 1899 – Grace, M. A Sketch of the New Zealand War
- 1900 – Arnold, Thomas. Passages in a Wandering Life [Chapters 3 and 4]
- 1902 – Hadfield, O. Maoris of By-gone Days
- 1903 – Clarke, George. Notes on Early Life in New Zealand
- 1904 – Campbell, R. Reminiscences of a Long Life in Scotland, New Zealand
- 1904 – Malcolm, E. M. – My Own Story: An Episode in the Life of a New Zealand Settler of 50 Years Back.
- 1907 – Wilson, J. A. The Story of Te Waharoa...Sketches of Ancient Maori Life and History
- 1908 – McNab, R. Historical Records of New Zealand, Volume I
- 1908 – Webster, John. Reminiscences of an Old Settler in Australia and New Zealand [Selected chapters]
- 1909? – Blake, A. H. Sixty Years in New Zealand
- 1912 – Berry, A. Reminiscences of Alexander Berry
- 1913 – Nihoniho, T. Narrative of the Fighting on the East Coast
- 1914 – Harper, H W. Letters from New Zealand [Letters I-IX only, 1857–1869]
- 1914 – McNab, R. Historical Records of New Zealand, Vol. II.
- 1927 – Butler, John. Earliest New Zealand: the Journals and Correspondence of the Rev. John Butler
- 1925 – Morton, H. B. Recollections of Early New Zealand
- 1927 – Saunders, A. Tales of a Pioneer
- 1928 – Grace, T. S. A Pioneer Missionary among the Maoris 1850–1879
- 1928 – McRae, A. Journal kept in New Zealand in 1820
- 1932 – Elder, J. (Ed.) The Letters and Journals of Samuel Marsden
- 1932 – Williams, W. L. East Coast N.Z. Historical Records
- 1934 – Elder, J. Marsden's Lieutenants
- 1935 – Stack, J. W. Early Maoriland Adventures of J. W. Stack
- 1936 – Stack, J. W. More Maoriland Adventures of J. W. Stack
- 1938 – Stack, J. W. and E. Further Maoriland Adventures of J. W. and E. Stack
- 1940 – Mathew, Felton. The Founding of New Zealand: The Journals of Felton Mathew, First Surveyor-General of New Zealand, and his Wife, 1840–1847.
- 1961 – Selwyn, Sarah H. Reminiscences, 1809–1867.
- 1961 – The Richmond-Atkinson Papers Vol I
- 1961 – The Richmond-Atkinson Papers Vol II
- 1961 – Williams, H. The Early Journals of Henry Williams
- 1963 – Markham, Edward. New Zealand or Recollections of it
- 1974 – Williams, W. The Turanga Journals
