= Richard Davis (missionary) =

New Zealand meteorologist (1790–1863)

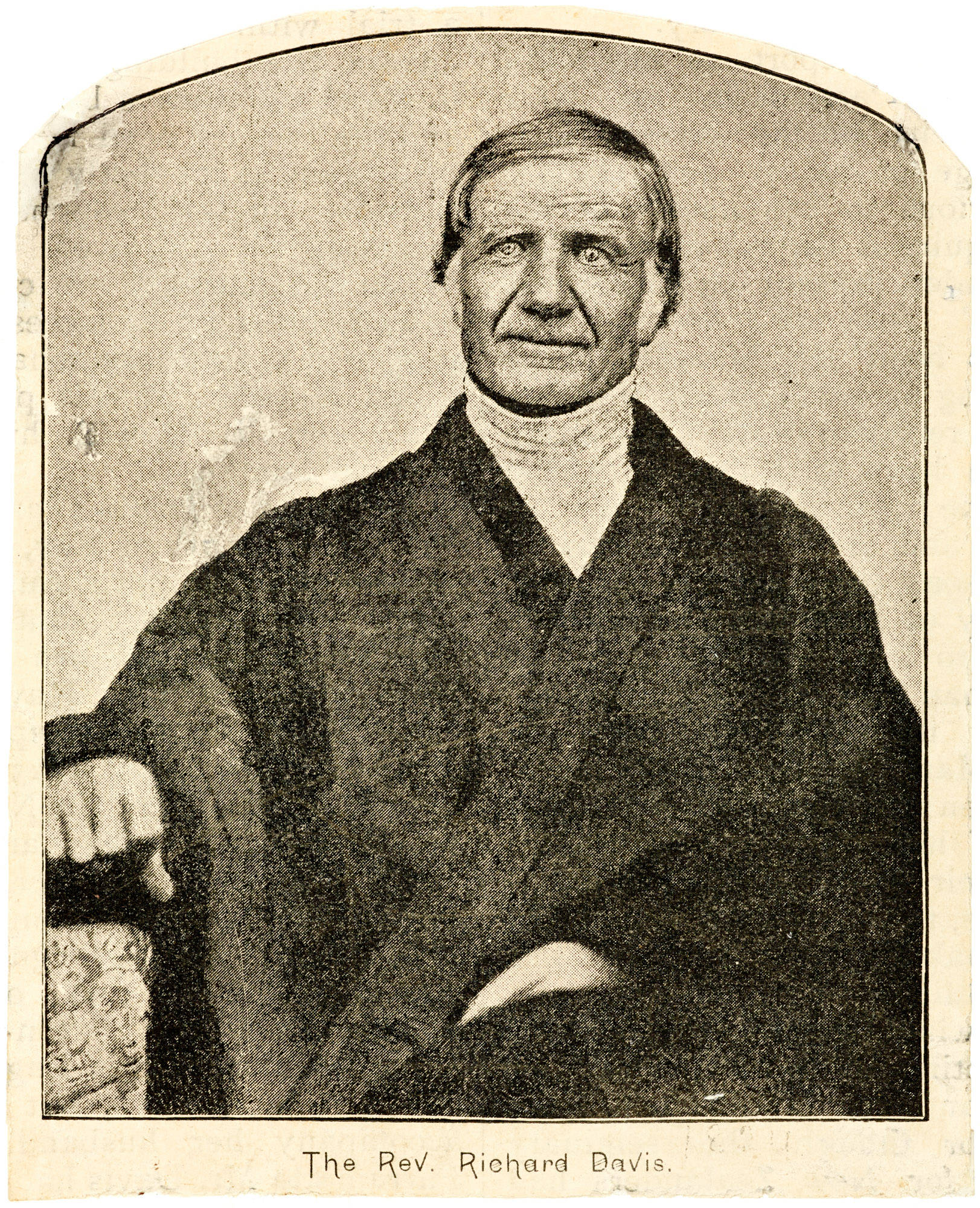
- Born: 18 January 1790; Dorset, England
- Died: 28 May 1863 (aged 73); Bay of Islands, New Zealand
- Known for: Meteorology, missionising

Reverend Richard Davis (18 January 1790 – 28 May 1863) was a New Zealand meteorologist, missionary and farmer. He made weather recordings in the northern North Island from 1839 to 1844, and 1849 to 1851, making them the oldest continuous land-based recordings in New Zealand. In 2019 they were inscribed into UNESCO's Memory of the World Aotearoa New Zealand Ngā Mahara o te Ao documentary heritage register. Davis was born in Dorset, England.

== Career ==
Davis was a missionary. The Church Mission Society sent Davis and his wife and six children to Northland in 1824, from Dorset. He then started a farm at Waimate North in 1830 and grew seeds from England, including both fruits and vegetables. Understanding the climate was required to grow these plants. He was ordained on Trinity Sunday 1843. He was appointed to Kaikohe from 1845 to 1854, then he returned to Te Waimate Mission from 1854 to 1863.

Davis made weather records in two journals, one from 1839 to 1844 at Te Waimate Mission and Kaikohe, and the other from 1849 to 1851. The gap occurred when Davis was ordained a deacon and established Kaikohe Mission Station. The recordings were of temperature and barometric pressure, with qualitative comments on wind speed and direction, extreme weather and cloud cover. The temperature was recorded twice a day, at 9 am and noon, and the air pressure was also measured at noon. There are two records of snowfall which is a rare event in Auckland and Northland, having only occurred since European settlement six times as of 2016. An entry from 30 July 1849 reads: "Hail storms. This morning the southern hills and Poutahi covered with snow".

The recordings are believed to be the oldest continuous land-based recordings in New Zealand, possibly making Davis the country's first meteorologist. The Royal Engineers had begun making regular land-based observations in Auckland in the 1850s. The observations have been used by the National Institute of Water and Atmospheric Research (NIWA) to study the weather in that region of the country as well as climate change. In 2019 Davis's weather records were inscribed into UNESCO's Memory of the World Aotearoa New Zealand Ngā Mahara o te Ao documentary heritage register. They are kept at the Auckland Council Libraries.

Davis had also sent several hundred letters to England, which included observations of geography, social interactions between European settlers and Māori, and astronomy, including comets and the southern lights.

== Personal life ==
Davis was born on 18 January 1790 in Dorset, England. He died on 28 May 1863 in New Zealand. His friend Reverend John Coleman wrote a memoir about him.
