= Te Wera Hauraki =

Te Wera Hauraki (?–1839) was a rangatira (chieftain) of the Ngāti Hineira and Te Uri Taniwha hapū of the Ngāpuhi iwi from the Northland region of New Zealand. From about 1818 to 1821, Te Wera went on expeditions and fought battles in the Bay of Plenty and the East Coast. In 1823, he was one of the leaders of the Ngāpuhi attack that defeated Te Arawa at Mokoia island in Lake Rotorua. Following the attack, Te Wera and his wife, Te Ao-kapurangi, negotiated a peace that prevented Ngāpuhi from taking further action against Te Arawa. After the conclusion of peace, he continued east and settled at Māhia Peninsula in Hawke's Bay, where he allied with Te Whareumu of Ngāti Rakaipaaka and Ngāti Hikairo and Te Pareihe of Ngāti Te Whatuiāpiti, helping them to fight off incursions from other tribes, especially Ngāti Te Ūpokoiri and Ngāti Raukawa. He remained at Māhia until his death in 1839.

== Early life ==
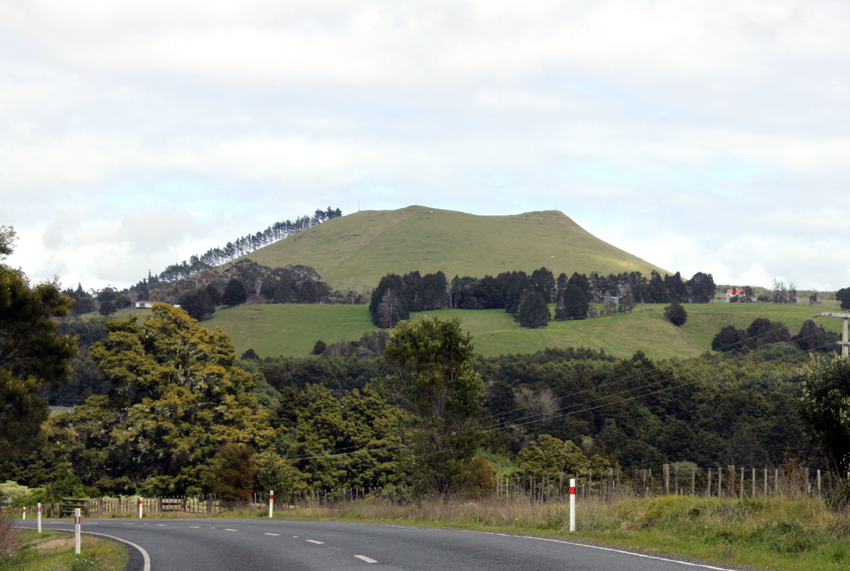
Te Ahuahu, Bay of Islands, where Te Wera grew up.

Hauraki was the son of Kaiteke or Kaitara, a leader of Ngāti Hineira and Te Uri Taniwha hapū of Ngāpuhi. His mother may have been Inu of Ngāti Pou. He had a brother, Te Kōpiri. He lived in Pukenui pa at Te Ahuahu, in the Bay of Islands in his youth.

Hauraki and Te Kōpiri fought as young men in the battle fought by Whāingaroa to drive Ngāti Pou from Taiāmai to Whangaroa and Hokianga. In 1817 Hauraki was living in the village of Motuiti, downstream from Kerikeri.

== Expeditions to the Bay of Plenty and East Coast ==
Te Wera's early campaigns.
1 Pukenui pa
2 Te Teko
3 Waipaoa
4 Te Whetū-matarau pā
5 Te Māhia peninsula
6 Tauranga
7 Pongakawa
8 Mokoia Island, Lake Rotorua

In 1818, Te Wera joined his relative Te Morenga on a campaign to the Bay of Plenty. The force landed at Te Teko and marched inland up the Rangitaiki River. He had returned to Motuiti by October 1819. Probably on this expedition, he captured Te Ao-kapurangi, a chieftainess of Ngāti Rangiwewehi and took her as his wife. They had a child who was accidentally burnt, from which Hauraki took the name Te Wera ("the burning").

=== 1819–1821 expedition ===
At the end of 1819, Te Wera, Tītore, and others set out on another expedition to the East Coast, which lasted sixteen months. They may have helped Peehi Tūkorehu of Waikato to attack Rongowhakaata on the Waipaoa River in Poverty Bay and Pōmare to capture Te Whetū-matarau pā at Te Kawakawa (Te Araroa) on the Awatere River. They certainly attacked Te Māhia peninsula, where Te Wera captured 40 prisoners, including Te Whareumu of Ngāti Rakaipaaka and his sister, whom he probably married.

=== Mokoia campaign, 1823 ===
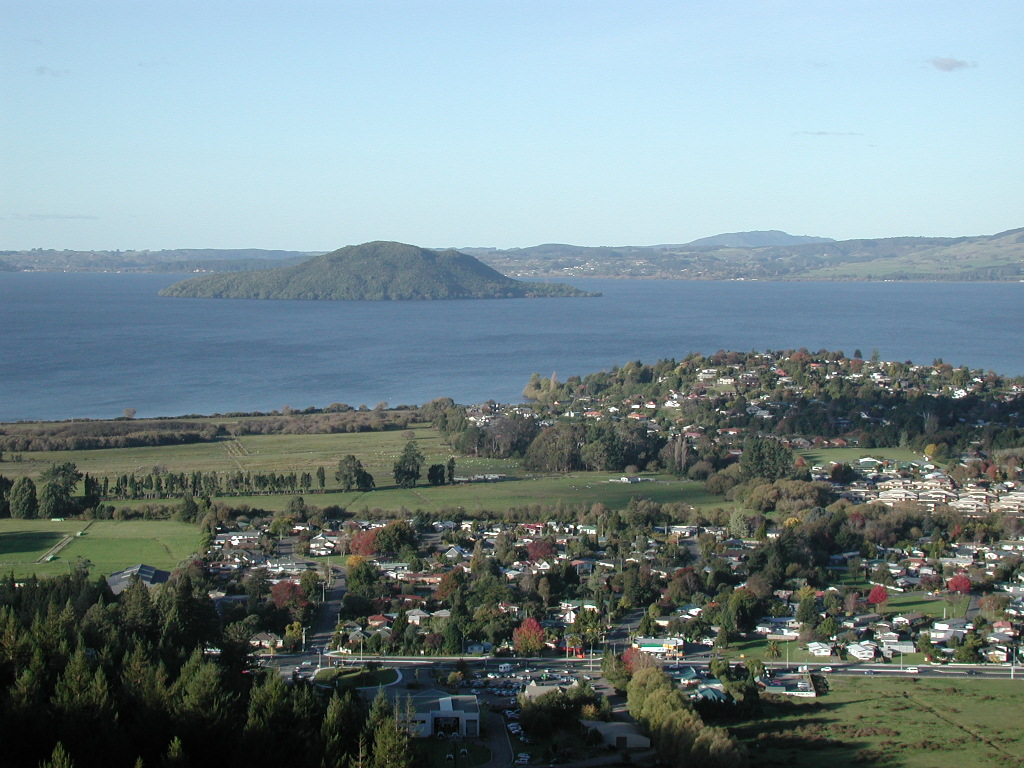
Mokoia Island in Lake Rotorua.

In 1822, at the instigation of Te Rauparaha and Te Whatanui, Te Pae-o-te-rangi of Ngāpuhi was killed by members of the Tūhourangi iwi of Te Arawa at Lake Rotokākahi. Other members of his expedition were killed as they fled by Ngāti Whakaue at Ōhinemutu. When the news reached Ngāpuhi there was a protracted debate about how to respond. Te Koki and Ta-waewae called for an immediate attack, saying “blood has flown; do not let it get cold!” But Te Wera convinced Ngāpuhi to wait a year, saying, "leave it for next year, so that dried kumara and fish may be obtained for the belly that supports the legs."

Thus, in February 1823, Te Wera, Pōmare, and Hongi Hika led an expedition to the Bay of Plenty. The force landed at Tauranga and headed up the Pongakawa valley to attack Mokoia Island on Lake Rotorua, where the forces of Te Arawa had gathered in expectation of the Ngāpuhi attack. Te Ao-kapurangi, who was related to the people of the area, negotiated safe passage up the valley for the expedition. In exchange, she got the war party to agree that they would not attack the members of her own hapū on Mokoia. Hongi Hika agreed to this on the condition that everyone who was spared had to pass between her legs. She went into Mokoia with her co-wife, Tahu, and tried to convince her hapū to leave the island before the battle, but they refused.

According to Hongi Hika, Te Wera and Pōmare attacked the island first and were driven back. Hongi Hika then attacked with the main body of Ngāpuhi troops and they succeeded in landing. Takaanui Hōhaia Tarakawa says that Hongi Hika was at the front and was knocked down by a bullet to his helmet, while Te Wera and Pōmare were in the second wave. Te Arawa fell back after 170 men had been killed. Te Ao-kapurangi went into battle with Ngāpuhi, climbed up onto the roof of the wharenui Tama-te-kapua, which had been designated as the safehouse, and called her people to come into the house to safety (passing under her legs in the process), inspiring the saying Ano ko te whare whawhao a Te Ao-kapurangi ("this is the crowded house of Te Ao-kapurangi").

After the battle, Hone Te Hihiko, the son of Te Ao-kapurangi by her first husband came secretly to Mokoia island and met up with her and Te Wera. The next morning, when Ngāpuhi gathered to discuss continuing their campaign against Te Arawa and settling permanently in the area, Te Wera, called up Te Hihiko, saying, "Behold! O Ngāpuhi!... my back has been climbed by one who is now in your presence" and he insisted that Ngāpuhi make peace with Te Arawa and end the campaign. Tarakawa concludes that Te Wera and Te Ao-kapurangi's quick action saved Te Arawa from destruction. After this, Hongi Hika and the majority of the war party departed northwards.

=== Restoration of Te Whareumu, 1823 ===
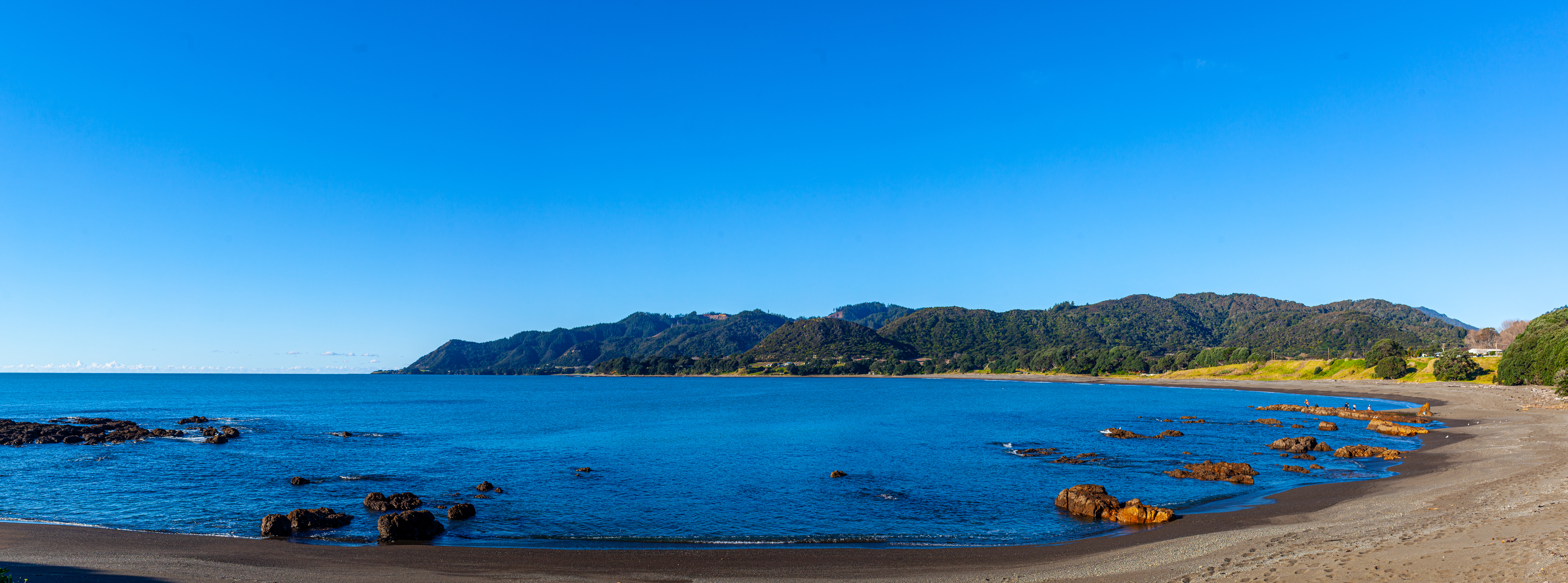
Te Kaha-nui-a-Tiki Bay.

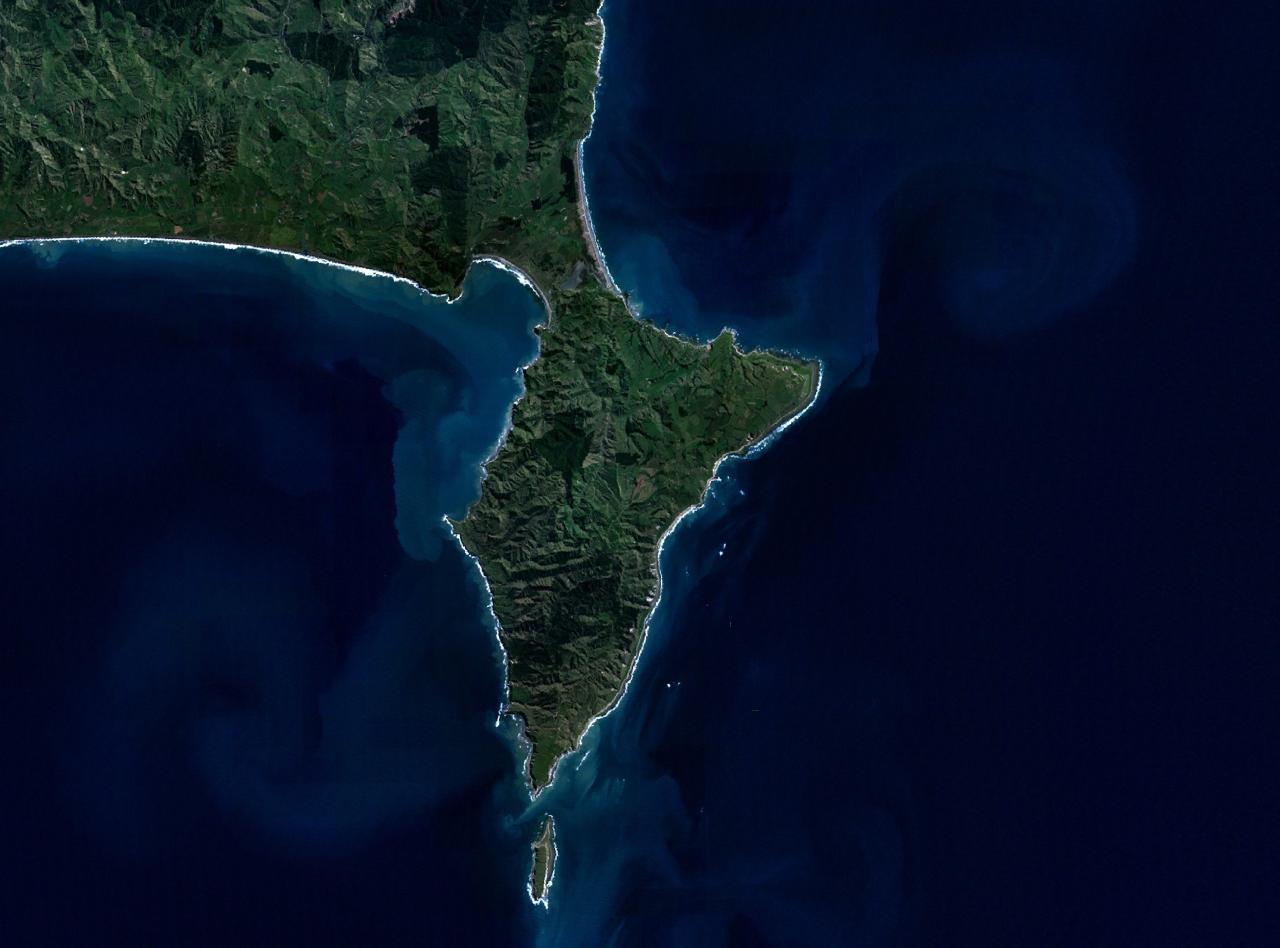
Te Māhia peninsula.

Te Wera had promised to return Te Whareumu and his people to Te Māhia peninsula, so he took his step-sons and continued eastward with Pōmare via Whakatāne and Ōpōtiki, where the local people were frightened by the force and fled inland. At Wharekura near Te Kaha-nui-a-Tiki, the local people, Te Whānau-ā-Apanui, attacked Te Wera's force and killed his nephew, Marino. Te Wera avenged his death the next day at Whangaparaoa, when he killed the chief Te Pakipaki-rauiri. At the Waiapu River, Pōmare decided to lead his forces elsewhere.

At Tūranganui (modern Gisborne), Te Wera was met by Te Kani-a-Takirau of Te Aitanga-a-Hauiti who had clashed with him on one of his previous expeditions, but now wanted Te Wera to help him in his ongoing conflict with Ngāti Porou and to help find the tribe's leader, his grandmother Hinematioro. Te Wera agreed to do so, once he had returned Te Whareumu to Te Māhia.

When Te Wera arrived at Te Māhia, Te Whareumu's people, Ngāti Rakaipaaka, were scattered in the hills and Ngāti Hikairo had fled to Waikawa island, as a result of raids by Te Aitanga-a-Hauiti and Ngāti Raukawa in 1821 and 1822. Te Wera persuaded them to meet him at Pukenui Beach, at the neck of the peninsula. Te Whareumu was returned to his people and he called for them to allow Te Wera to settle permanently and help them restore the lands that they had lost to Ngāti Raukawa, saying "he will be a father to us; he will be our fort and he will shelter us from the winds that blow from the south." Te Wera was given lands on the peninsula and allowed to settle there as the community's leader. Although he had intended to stay only briefly, he ended up remaining at Te Māhia for the rest of his life. His force was armed with muskets, which the local people did not yet possess.

== Campaigns in Hawke's Bay ==
Te Wera's Hawke's Bay campaigns
1 Ahuriri / Te Pakake
2 Waimārama
3 Tānenui-a-rangi
4 Lake Rotoatara
5 Titirangi
6 Pakowhai
7 Te Whiti-o-Tū
8 Ōkūrārenga / Kaiuku

Te Wera was approached by two local rangatira who wanted his help in getting revenge for injuries that they had suffered and he agreed to help them. Te Hauwaho of the Ngāti Pārau hapū of Ngāti Te Whatuiāpiti, who was based in Heretaunga (Hawke's Bay), had lost his brother, Hungahunga, at the hands of Ngāti Te Ūpokoiri. Te Waikōpiro / Te Waikōpua of Wairoa had lost his young son Whakapararākau to people in the Wairarapa.

Together with Te Whareumu and Te Hauwaho, Te Wera led a force to Ahuriri (modern Napier), where they killed some women of Ngāti Te Ūpokoiri. They went south to Cape Kidnappers and attacked Kurupō Te Moananui of the Ngāti Hāwea hapū of Ngāti Te Whatuiāpiti. Then they planned to move inland and attack Te Pareihe, the leader of Ngāti Te Whatuiāpiti, but they were stopped at Waimārama by Tiakitai of Ngāti Kurukuru. Te Wera made camp at Tānenui-a-rangi on the Ngaruroro River near Pakowhai.

Te Pareihe and Tiakitai now came to Tānenui-a-rangi, intending to make an alliance. Te Wera's forces surrounded them, but they negotiated a peace. Te Pareihe's tau (song sung at the start of a speech) is preserved by Takaanui Tarakawa and John Te Herekiekie Grace. In it, he calls Te Wera his awhe pumahuru ("steadfast plume"). Te Pareihe wanted to reclaim his pā on an island in Lake Rotoatara (near Te Aute), which had been captured in 1822 by a Ngāti Tūwharetoa force from Lake Taupō under the command of Mananui Te Heuheu in the Kahupapa Battle and was now occupied by Ngāti Te Ūpokoiri. Ballara says that the combined force successfully took back the fortress.

Some of the forces of Te Wera and Tiakitai went with Te Waikōpiro to get revenge on the Wairarapa people.

=== Titirangi, 1824 ===
In 1824, Te Mautaranui of Tuhoe and Ngāti Awa gathered a force in order to get revenge on Ranga-ika of Ngāti Kahungunu for killing the Tūhoe rangatira Rangiwaitatao. Among his allies was Pōmare of Ngāpuhi, who landed at Te Māhia with a war party armed with guns, joined Te Wera, and marched up the Wairoa River to the Ngāti Kahungunu stronghold at Titirangi, located on the Waiau River and defended by Te Whenua-riri, Hipara, and Ranga-ika.

According to Tūhoe tradition, when Ngāti Kahungunu scouts reported to Ranga-ika that a war party armed with pū (“guns”), he was completely unfazed, because he knew pū only as the Māori word for a type of trumpet. Pōmare attacked immediately and as his forces loaded their guns, the Ngāti Kahungunu defenders stood there asking one another why Ngapuhi were pointing the narrow end of their trumpets at them instead of the broad end. Te Whenua-riri and many other defenders were killed, but Hipara and Ranga-ika escaped.

=== Te Pakake, 1825 ===
In 1825, Te Pareihe's tohunga, Toiroa, had a dream that Waikato would soon invade the region. In response, Te Wera returned to the Māhia peninsula and persuaded Te Pareihe to lead Ngāti Whatuiapiti back there as well. Many people of Ngāti Kahungunu refused to follow him. Instead, the tribes of Ngāti Hinepare, Ngāti Hāwea, Ngāti Tukuoterangi, Ngāti Rangikamangungu, and Ngāti Matepu settled at Te Pakake Pā, on an island at the mouth of Ahuriri lagoon. Soon after this, a force of Ngāti Tūwharetoa, Waikato, Ngāti Maniapoto, Ngāti Raukawa, and Ngāti Maru led by Mananui Te Heuheu and Te Wherowhero arrived in the region and destroyed Te Pakake.

=== Attack on Tuatini ===
At an uncertain point before 1827, Te Umu-ariki of Ngāti Awa and Tūhoe was killed along with three of Te Wera's men by people of Rongowhakaata and Te Aitanga-a-Mahaki at Turihaunga (near Whāngārā) in Poverty Bay. Therefore, Te Wera took three canoes north to get revenge. He reunited with Te Kani-a-Takirau, whose Te Aitanga a Hauiti hapū joined him. Te Wera led his troops to Tokomaru Bay, where Ngāti Porou had gathered at Tuatini pā under Te Rere-horua. After a couple of days, the Ngāpuhi men climbed up to the walls of the fortress, threw ropes over the palisade, and used them to pull down the posts, so that they could enter the fortress. Te Rere-horua, Kha-wai, and others were killed. Te Wera returned to Te Mahia after that, but a state of hostility endured until 1838, when the people of Tokomaru Bay asked the missionary William Williams to broker a peace with Te Wera for them.

Sometime after this, Te Wera joined Tiakitai on an expedition south to attack Hakikino at Maungarake (near Masterton in the Wairarapa). They captured many slaves, including the chieftainess Matahi of Ngāti Hika-rahui.

=== Attack of Te Momo-a-Irawaru, 1827 ===
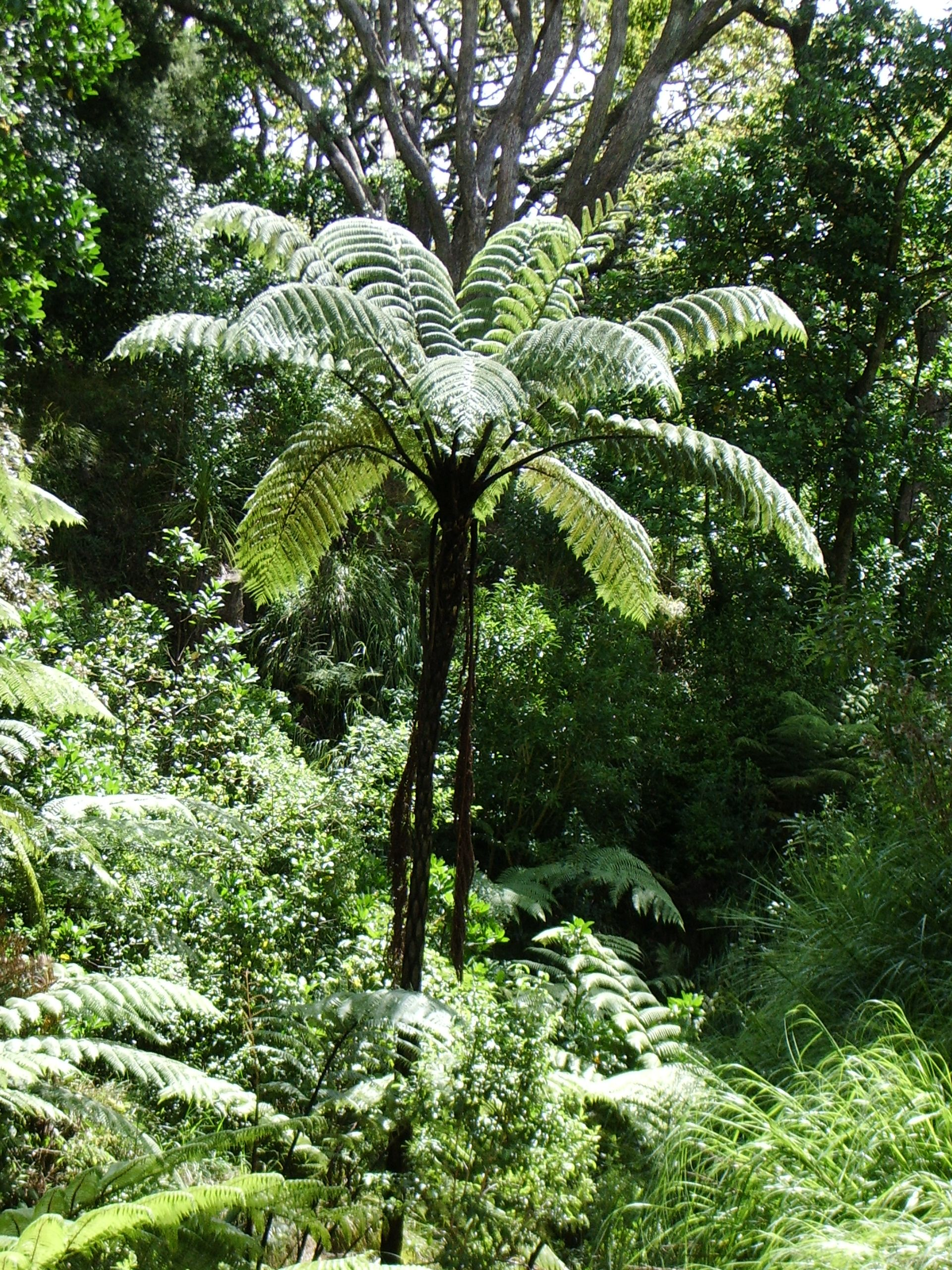
Kōrau (black tree fern).

In 1827, a group of Ngāti Raukawa decided to make another attempt to settle in the Hawke’s Bay region, as a result of attacks on them by Ngāti Paoa and Ngāti Haua. They convinced the Ngāti Te Ūpokoiri and Ngāti Te Kohera to join them. The Ngāti Te Upokoiri contingent was led by Te Whiuwhiuhoia, Motumotu, and Te Puke. The Ngāti Te Kohera force was led by Te Momo-a-Irawaru.

Te Momo-a-Irawaru attempted to recruit Te Heuheu, but he refused because of the magnitude of the defeat he had received at Te Whitiotu in 1823. Te Momo-a-Irawaru decided to attack anyway and Te Heuheu was so angry at this that he secretly sent messengers to Te Wera, Te Whareumu, and Paraihe saying "Do not allow the ashes of Te Momo's fire to take hold. Extinguish them!" thus warning them of the attack to come. Tiakitai also sent warnings to them. At Te Mahia peninsula, Te Wera, Te Whareumu, and Paraihe gathered a force of 2,000 men, armed with muskets and set out to defend themselves. At Ahuriri, they were joined by Tiakitai.

When they arrived in Hawke's Bay, Te Momo-a-Irawaru led part of the force to Lake Rotoatara and Te Whiuwhiuhoia led the rest to Lake Poukawa. At Rotoatara, Paraihe had built a new pā on the edge of the lake, called Te Kahotea, which Te Momo captured.

According to Grace, Te Momo received a message from a friendly local chief, Paerikiriki, warning him about Te Wera, Te Whareumu, and Te Pareihe’s approaching force and they therefore marched to attack him at his pā, Pakowhai. According to Tarakawa, Paerikiriki led a force of 140 men to attack Te Wera and his allies at Te Upoko-o-te-arawhata. Either way, Paerikiriki was defeated and attempted to flee, but was shot by one of Te Wera's chiefs, Te Ipututu Tarakawa, from an enormous distance. A lament for Paerikiriki is preserved by John Te Herekiekie Grace and Takaanui Hōhaia Tarakawa.

The force continued on to Lake Rotoatara, where victory was predicted for them by Te Pareihe's tohunga, Toiroa. The force moved on to Kahotea, where Toiroa pointed out a broken musket, asserting "By this gun shall the chief die!" The force easily took Kahotea and the defenders fled for the Ruahine range. Ngāpuhi pursued some of the routed enemy towards Ohau-heihei and fought a short engagement with them before the chieftainess Parerape and Te Ipututu Tarakawa brokered a truce.

Te Momo-a-Irawaru was away while this was happening, collecting kōrau (black tree fern), so the attackers waited for him to return. He came walking with his two children and was attacked by a warrior called Karaitiana and had just managed to fight him off when he was shot with the broken musket by a Ngāpuhi chief called Peketahi.

=== Conquest of Lake Rotoatara ===
Te Whiuwhiuhoia now led his men from Lake Poukawa to join the remnants of Te Momo-a-Irawaru’s forces at Lake Rotoatara. From there, he raided the kumara fields of Ngāpuhi and Ngāti Whatuiapiti at Te Whanganui a Orotu (on the Wharerangi flats west of Napier), killing all of the women who were working there. Te Wera and Te Pereihe launched an expedition in revenge, taking their canoes up the Tukituki river to Papanui (near Patangata), where they hauled the canoes over to Lake Rotoatara and besieged the island fortress for two months (according to Grace) or six days (according to Tarakawa). Te Wera offered safe passage out of the fortress for Tamahaere and his daughter Rangi-wawahia, because they were relatives of Te Ipututu Tarakawa, but they refused.

When the defenders were out of food, Te Pereihe landed on the island by night and attacked suddenly at dawn, taking the pā, and killing most of the defenders. Te Motumotu attempted to escape with his wife and daughter in a canoe, but was caught and killed. Other chiefs killed included Te Puke, Te Whiuwhiuhoia, Tamatehura, Taina, Marukuru, Tamahaere, and Heriheri. A lament by Te Waingongo of Ngāti Takihiku for Tamahaere and Heriheri is preserved by John Te Herekiekie Grace. Among the captured prisoners was Rēnata Kawepō.

=== Battle of Te Whiti-o-Tū ===
All of Te Wera and Tiakitai's forces had now returned to Rotoatara. Pareihe said "O Wera! will you and your young people take me to the oven in which were cooked my elder brethren and relatives," so Te Wera agreed to send 140 Ngāpuhi up the Waipawa River, commanded by Te Hihiko and Rangituruturua, in order to get revenge for Pereihe. Near Tikokino, before they had crossed the Ruahine ranges, they unexpectedly encountered a force of three hundred men of Ngāti Tūwharetoa, Ngāti Te Upokoiri, Ngāti Whiti, Ngāti Tama, Tūhoe and Ngāti Hinemanu led by Te Wanikau, Te Huiatahi, Te Whakaheke and Toatoa. They wanted a more decisive victory than the one achieved in 1822, and in the event of a victory, they planned to settle in the region permanently.

Te Hihiko and Te Huiatahi were related, so they met to discuss, but as Te Hihiko returned to the rest of his army, the enemy opened fire. Ngāpuhi feigned a retreat (Māori: manukāwhaki), fleeing up Te Whiti-o-Tū hill. Whakaheke had just caught up with Rangituruturua's part of the force and was about to strike a fatal blow, when Te Hihiko's men opened fire. Te Whakaheke was shot by Te Rangihau (with his broken musket) and Totoa was shot by Tarakawa. Tūwharetoa and their allies broke and ran. More than fifty Tūwharetoa died, including all the commanders except for Te Wanikau.

On returning to Rotoatara, Te Wera called a meeting at Tanenuiarangi and he convinced Pareihe and Tiakitai that the situation was still dangerous and that they should bring all their people to Māhia, where he could protect them.

=== Battle of Kaiuku, 1828 ===
In 1828, a coalition of Ngāti Maru, Ngāti Raukawa, Ngāti Tūwharetoa, Te Arawa, and Waikato invaded Hawke's Bay, seeking revenge on Te Wera and Te Pareihe for various earlier defeats. According to Grace, this may have been the largest force assembled by Māori up to that point. They besieged Te Pareihe and Te Wera at Ōkūrārenga pā on the Māhia peninsula. The defenders became so short on food that they were reduced to eating clay and as a result the event is known as Kaiuku ("eating clay"). Eventually, however the Tūwharetoa contingent under Te Heuheu and the Te Arawa contingent under Te Mokonuiarangi withdrew and the siege came to an end.

=== Battle of Te Ruru ===
After 1826, Te Whatanui of Ngāti Raukawa gathered a war party to get revenge for the death of Te Momo-a-Irawaru. He was joined by his allies Ngāti Mutuahi and Ngāti Pakapaka of Rangitāne. They came through the Manawatū Gorge and killed two distinguished women, Paeroa and Kutia. In revenge, Te Wera attacked them at the Battle of Te Ruru (near modern Dannevirke).

In 1832, Te Wera made plans to join the attack of his kinsman Tītore on Tauranga, but this did not come to pass.

== Expedition to Toka-a-Kuku ==
Site of Toka-a-Kuku.

Around 1836, Te Wera attacked Te Whānau-a-Apanui in order to get revenge for the death of his nephew Marino in 1823. Te Wera set out by canoe in March, rowing around East Cape and landed at Toka-a-Kuku pā (near Te Kaha), which he placed under siege. The local chief Tatua-harakeke took his canoe along the Bay of Plenty coast, gathering allies to come to his aid.

The allies arrived five days later. A hundred of them snuck into Toka-a-Kuku in the night, while another eight hundred landed at Hariki beach and planned to attack Te Wera from behind. As they landed, the defenders of Toka-a-Kuku launched a sortie but Te Wera split his forces, sending seventy musketmen to attack the new arrivals, leaving a hundred to maintain the siege. Although attacked three times, the force of seventy men defeated the army of eight hundred. When the defenders in Toka-a-Kuku saw that their reinforcements had been beaten back, they launched a desperate all out attack on the besiegers, but they were defeated, too, and Te Wera took Toka-a-Kuku pā. Seventy chiefs of Te Whānau-a-Apanui were killed, including Rangipaturiri, Te Kaka-pai-waho, Te Hautorua, and Tuteranginoti.

After the battle, Te Wera had a platform built and hung the dead bodies on it. He gave a speech proclaiming that these deaths had avenged the earlier death of his nephew Marino and forbade his men from eating the dead. Then Te Werea said, "I will return now, as well as you, to Nukutaurua [Te Māhia]. You will never be abandoned by me, and I will die with you, O Ngāti Kahungunu," and he returned with them to Te Māhia.

== Death ==
Te Wera died of old age in 1839. His funeral was attended by the people of Ngāti Porou, Ngāti Hauiti, Rongowhakaata, Te Aitanga a Mahaki, and Ngai Tahupo. His body may have been taken to his childhood home at Te Ahuahu in the Bay of Islands for burial. Takaanui Tarakawa says of him:

The people who lived under his authority wondered at him, on account of his admirable government. Great was his name, and far spreading his fame to all the bounds of the East Coast, and even to the West Coast. His magnanimity towards those under him was great. He never feared war, and great was his knowledge of strategy in besieging pas, and causing the overthrow of the enemy in battle. Never was he accused of evil deeds, nor did he ever abandon those who placed themselves under his guidance and beneficent rule. He never presumed to advise any treacherous dealings towards other tribes, or evil of other kinds, nor wantonly attacked other tribes without good cause. If a messenger came asking his assistance, he carefully inquired into the cause, and if he saw it was unjustifiable he would say, “Begone! Do thy own work.” But if Te Wera saw it was a just cause he would consent to conduct the war in order that it might be quickly closed. Great is the reputation of this chief.

— Takaanui Hōhaia Tarakawa

Takaanui Tarakawa also preserves a waiata composed for Te Wera:

Kī a Te Wēra ra
E hau nei o rongo,
Ki te hauauru,
Na te aroha e huri nei,
I ahau, mo te wai o te kamo
E tarutua nei-i-e-i.

—Tarakawa 1900, p. 71
Translation:

(Give thought) to Te Wera there,
Whose fame spreads afar,
Even to the distant west,
For the sorrow that overcomes me,
For the tears of my eyes
That silently fall.

—Tarakawa 1900, pp. 80–81

== Family ==
Te Wera married Te Ao-kapurangi, a chieftainess of Ngāti Rangiwewehi, who claimed descent from Tāwhaki, after he captured her during the raid to Rangitāiki in 1819. She had children by her previous marriage to Rauru of Tapuika Hone Te Hihiko and Te Ipututu Tarakawa.

He probably married the sister of Te Whareumu of Nukutaurua, whom he captured at Māhia in 1820/21.

He also married Tahu.

== Sources ==
The story of Te Wera was recounted in the Journal of the Polynesian Society's 1899 and 1900 volumes by Takaanui Hōhaia Tarakawa, the son of Te Wera's step-son Te Ipututu Tarakawa. Te Wera's activities are also recorded by Percy Smith in Maori Wars of the Nineteenth Century of 1910, based in part on Tamarau Waiari (1835-1904) of Tūhoe, and by John Te Herekiekie Grace in his 1959 history of Ngāti Tūwharetoa.

== Bibliography ==
- Tarakawa, Takaanui (1899). "Nga Mahi A Te Wera, Me Nga-Puhi Hoki, Ki Te Tai-Rawhiti / The Doings of Te Wera-Hauraki and Nga-Puhi, on the East Coast, N.Z". Journal of the Polynesian Society. 8: 179–187, 235–249.
- Tarakawa, Takaanui (1900). "Nga mahi a Te Wera, me Nga-Puhi hoki, ki Te Tai-Rawhiti/ The Doings of Te Wera and Nga-Puhi on the East Coast". Journal of the Polynesian Society. 9: 47–62, 65–84, 135–141.
- Smith, Percy (1910). Maori Wars of the Nineteenth Century. Christchurch: Whitcombe and Tombs Limited.
- Grace, John Te Herekiekie (1959). Tuwharetoa: The history of the Maori people of the Taupo District. Auckland [N.Z.]: A.H. & A.W. Reed.
- Ballara, Angela. "Te Wera Hauraki". Dictionary of New Zealand Biography. Ministry for Culture and Heritage.
