= Tohitapu =

New Zealand Māori tribal leader (died 1833)

Tohitapu also known as Tohi or Toi-Tapu (died 14 July 1833) was a rangatira (chief) of the Te Roroa iwi (tribe) of Northland, New Zealand, and a tohunga and Māori warrior. An account told by a Ngāpuhi informant to British ethnographer John White of the visit of Marion du Fresne to the Bay of Islands in 1772 describes Tohitapu as participating in the massacre when du Fresne and 26 men of his crew were killed and cannibalised.

== Spiritual leader ==
As a Tohunga o Tumatauenga (expert in weapons or war party chaplain) he was acknowledged by the Ngāpuhi of the Bay of Islands as a spiritual leader who possessed the ability of communicating between the spiritual and temporal realms through karakia (prayers), pātere (chants) or performing waiata (songs). On 28 November 1832, the Revd. Alfred Brown witnessed Tohitapu practicing as a Tohunga to foresee the success of Tītore’s second muru (war expedition) to Tauranga, which followed the Girls' War in the Bay of Islands.

== The gate incident ==
Tohitapu lived at Te Haumi and was a frequent visitor to the Revd. Henry Williams at Paihia. Although there occurred miss-understandings and several confrontations between them. One of the most severe was the confrontation on 12 January 1824, which was witnessed by other chiefs. The incident began when Tohitapu visited the mission. As the gate was shut, Tohitapu jumped over the fence. Williams demanded that Tohitapu enter the mission using the gate. Tohitapu was a chief and a tohunga, skilled in the magic known as makutu. Tohitapu was offended by William's demand and began a threatening haka flourishing his mere and taiaha. Williams faced down this challenge. Tohitapu then seized a pot, which he claimed as compensation for hurting his foot in jumping over the fence, whereupon Williams seized the pot from Tohitapu. The incidence continued through the night during which Tohitapu began a karakia or incantation of bewitchment. Williams had no fear of the karakia. The next morning Tohitapu and Williams reconciled their differences, although the failure of the karakia to have any effect on Henry Williams reinforced his mana and created doubt among the Ngāpuhi as to the powers of a Tohunga.

Tohitapu remained a supporter of Williams and the mission at Paihia. In 1829, Tohitapu came to the assistance of the CMS missionaries when the action of one of the Māori assistants of the mission damaged part of one of Te Koki’s houses, which was a serious offence against Māori custom. Te Koki was the principal chief of the Ngāpuhi at Paihia, uncle of Hongi Hika, brother to Tuhikura, of Ngāti Rehua, and husband of Ana Hamu.

Tohitapu accepted changes that followed from the work of the CMS missionaries. In March 1828, Tohitapu, Henry Williams and George Clarke were present at fighting occurring between the Ngāpuhi and Te Mahurehure hapū (subtribe). Tohitapu addressed the Ngāpuhi and ordered that no fighting would take place the next day as it was a Sunday. The Revd A. N. Brown reported in his journal of August 1831 that Tohitapu choose to apply a less severe punishment to a slave, when the penalty under Māori custom was usually death.

== As a mediator ==
Tohitapu also engaged in mediation of conflicts between Ngāpuhi chiefs. The death of Tiki, a son of Pōmare I (also called Whetoi) and the subsequent death of Te Whareumu in 1828 threw the Hokianga into a state of uncertainty as the Ngāpuhi chiefs debated whether revenge was necessary following the death of a chief. Henry Williams, Richard Davis and Tohitapu mediated between the combatants. As the chiefs did not want to escalate the fighting, a peaceful resolution was achieved. During the Girls' War in March 1830, Tohitapu sought the assistance of the CMS missionaries to mediated between the combatants. In December 1831, Tohitapu requested that the CMS missionaries intervene to stop the fighting at Kororāreka between the warriors of Tītore and Tareha.

== Tohitapu ==
The journals of the Church Missionary Society (CMS) missionaries describe Tohitapu as a person of high intelligence and considerable mana among the Te Roroa and Ngāpuhi. The Revd. Henry Williams said “he is a very important person in his way, though our good folks generally cannot manage him”. Tohitapu did not renounce his status as a Tohunga and warrior or become a Christian. From January 1832 until late July 1832 Tohitapu was part of the muru, or war expedition, that Tītore and Ngāpuhi warriors made to Tauranga, which followed the Girls' War. In February 1833, Tohitapu joined the second muru led by Tītore with Te Rarawa warriors, allies of the Ngāpuhi, from the North Cape back to Tauranga to continue the war expedition. Henry Williams accompanied both expeditions in an attempt to bring them to a peaceful conclusion.

Tohitapu died in the Bay of Islands on 14 July 1833. On 17 January 1834, CMS missionaries went to Wangai, a settlement south-east of Paihia, to attend the funeral feast held at the hahunga (disinterment and bone cleansing ceremony) of the bones of Tohitapu.

== Literature and sources ==
- Bentley, Trevor (2010) - Cannibal Jack: The Life & Times of Jacky Marmon, a Pakeha-Maori, Penguin Books, New Zealand ISBN 978-0143203827
- Brown, Alfred Nesbit (1856) - Brief Memorials of an Only Son (2nd ed.) from Early New Zealand Books (ENZB).
- Carleton, Hugh (1874) - The life of Henry Williams, Archdeacon of Waimate, Volume I. Auckland NZ. Online available from Early New Zealand Books (ENZB).
- Fitzgerald, Caroline (2011) - Te Wiremu - Henry Williams: Early Years in the North, Huia Publishers, New Zealand ISBN 978-1-86969-439-5
- Fitzgerald, Caroline (2004) - Letters from the Bay of Islands, Sutton Publishing Limited, United Kingdom; ISBN 0-7509-3696-7 (Hardcover). Penguin Books, New Zealand, (Paperback) ISBN 0-14-301929-5
- Rogers, Lawrence M. (1973) - Te Wiremu: A Biography of Henry Williams, Christchurch : Pegasus Press
- Rogers, Lawrence M. (editor) (1961) - The Early Journals of Henry Williams 1826 to 1840. Christchurch : Pegasus Press. online available at New Zealand Electronic Text Centre (NZETC) (2011-06-27)
