= Te Morenga =

Māori chief (c.1760–1834)

- Born: c. 1760
- Died: December 1834 (Note: The exact date is not known. Te Morenga was last recorded in Henry Williams' journal as having visited Waitangi on 3 December 1834, dying a few days later. Another source notes that he had died in early 1834.) Whangaruru, Northland Region, New Zealand
- Allegiance: Ngāpuhi (Te Uri Kāpana)
- Conflicts: Musket Wars: Battle of Moremonui; Battle of Te Ika-a-Ranganui; Girls' War

Te Morenga (c. 1760 – December 1834) was a Māori rangatira (chief) of Ngāpuhi. Both an ally and a rival of Hongi Hika, he was a distinguished military leader and led several taua during the Musket Wars.

Te Morenga developed strong relationships with early missionaries in New Zealand, and most notably, Samuel Marsden. He lived at Taiāmai, near Waimate North.

== Early life ==
Little is known of his early life. Te Morenga was born circa 1760, the son of Whāingaroa, and was of the Ngāpuhi iwi, of the hapū Te Uri Kāpana. He had two known brothers, Te Koperu, and an elder brother named Iwi. He succeeded Perahiko as rangatira at Okura, Taiāmai.

== The Venus Incident ==
In 1806, the brig Venus, of which Charlotte Badger was a passenger, was involved in a mutiny. For several months after the mutiny, the mutineers sailed along the coast of New Zealand and eventually arrived at the Bay of Islands. There, they encountered Te Morenga's niece, a Ngāpuhi woman named Tawaputa, and lured her away from her friends and relatives. The mutineers sold her into slavery to Hukere, (Note: Spelt Hukori in one source.) a chief from Tauranga, in exchange for pigs and provisions, with one newspaper stating that the reason for the sale was that Tawaputa's worry had resulted in a loss of attractiveness. Hukere had a rivalry with a neighbour, a Ngāi Te Rangi chief named Te Waru. There are varying reports as to what happened next. Fergus Dunlop, writing for The New Zealand Herald, stated that Tawaputa was lacking in domestic value whilst, two months later, Dunlop, writing for the Otago Witness, iterated that perhaps she rejected Te Waru's addresses and preferred Hukere. Regardless of the reason, Te Waru killed and ate her.

Hukere, upon finding out, was incensed and communicated to Ngāpuhi about the matter. By that time, Ngāpuhi had forgiven and forgotten the original kidnapping of Tawaputa, however, when they found out about her murder, they were outraged and felt that punishment should be administered to both Hukere and Te Waru. According to Māori custom, and in conformity with his father's death bed wish, it was up to Te Morenga to exact utu for the incident, but he had to wait many years to do so.

In January 1818, under the leadership of Te Morenga, Ngāpuhi set out on an expedition of revenge, with about 1000 men, armed with 35 muskets. Hongi Hika, who was not ready at the time of Te Morenga's departure, left on 7 February 1818 to seek revenge for a relative of his, however, they did not meet on the way. Later that year, Te Morenga and his men landed at Whakatāne and attacked Ngāti Awa and Ngāti Pūkeko to avenge Te Morenga's sister, who had suffered a similar fate to Tawaputa at the East Cape at the hands of Ngāti Porou. The two tribes made a final stand at Otahakura pā, which was a few miles inland and situated on a spur. During the battle, Tama-arangi, a priest or matakite, and Te Huna-o-terangi of Ngāti Pūkeko were killed. Ngāpuhi was soon forced to retreat, due to help arriving to aid the defenders from the chief Kihi. In this retreat, Ngāpuhi suffered heavy losses, with Te Morenga and Korokoro forced to retire their waka at Whakatāne. It is believed only 50 of the Ngāpuhi escaped, if so, then only part of Te Morenga's total force could have engaged at Otahakura.

Soon after, Ngāpuhi landed at Mōtītī Island and attacked Te Waru's pā, Matarehua. Te Morenga killed Te Waru's uncle, Te Tawhio, among others, but Te Waru escaped to the mainland. Te Morenga then travelled to the East Cape, where he engaged in a lengthy battle with Ngāti Porou to avenge his sister. The party then returned to the Bay of Islands in November 1818, with two chiefs, besides others, as prisoners of war, many heads, as well as the spouse of the chief who had killed his sister, whom he subsequently gave to his brother as a wife.

In January 1820, Te Morenga led a further expedition to exact utu. After several days at sea, Te Morenga and his men landed at a beach at the mouth of the Tauranga Harbour, where they met Te Waru and his men. Supposedly, upon asking about the fate of Tawaputa, Te Waru responded that "she was no more." Te Morenga then asked where Te Waru had buried her, to which Te Waru patted his stomach and said "Here is the graveyard." Te Morenga, offended, then reportedly stated that he intended for Te Waru to occupy the same grave by the following day. After agreeing to fight, Te Morenga, with a force of 600 men, chose his ground, entrenched it and then invited Te Waru to do the same. Whilst Te Morenga and his men had 35 muskets, Te Waru's forces did not have any. Immediately, two of Te Waru's leading chiefs were killed and the rest of the party fled and took counsel. Te Morenga, who felt that sufficient vengeance had been exacted, offered friendship and forgiveness. Te Waru, refusing the offer, attacked again, with more fatal results. At least 400 men were killed and another 260 were taken prisoner. Te Waru himself escaped and with several survivors, paddled for about 10 miles across the harbour and concealed himself in the ferns and forest.

Te Waru captured a lone Ngāpuhi chief by subduing him with his mere and binding him with flaxen 'thongs.' He ordered his captive to march towards the invading army's fortifications, for there had been too much bloodshed. When they arrived at Te Morenga's fortification, Te Waru released his captive and surrendered, handing him his mere. The captive, surprised, marched Te Waru to Te Morenga. Te Morenga, shocked by Te Waru's voluntary surrender, pardoned him and offered eternal friendship, giving him one of the 35 muskets as a gift. Tawaputa's bones were subsequently buried.

Te Morenga then returned to the Bay of Islands, with the 260 captives and the heads of the 400 killed. He later recounted the story to Jules Dumont d'Urville, however, the validity of the story is unconfirmed. There are multiple different reports regarding Te Morenga's relation to the slain victim. Newspaper articles from 1927 report that Te Morenga's aunt was killed and eaten by Te Waru, without providing a name, whereas a newspaper article from 1895 states that it was his niece. Both An Encyclopaedia of New Zealand and the 1940 Dictionary of New Zealand Biography claimed it was his niece, whilst providing the name Tawaputa. A newspaper article from 1939 stated that there were claims that his sister was the one involved in the Venus Incident and that there were no evidence to support that that was the reason for the subsequent invasion, as no one on the East Cape had heard of the incident.

== Arrival of missionaries ==
Te Morenga first met Samuel Marsden when he first arrived in New Zealand in 1814 and developed a close relationship with him that lasted until Te Morenga's death in 1834. Marsden described Te Morenga as a man of "very sound and deep reflection," and also stated that "Te Morenga’s distinction is outstanding even among his great contemporaries." In return, Te Morenga praised Marsden as "a man who could preach, teach little children to read and write, administer medicine to them when they were sick, and show them how to cultivate their land."

In January 1815, when Marsden visited Te Haupa at Thames, Te Morenga accompanied him and acted as his interpreter. Following this, Te Morenga and another chief, Te Pehi, travelled to Parramatta, Australia, in the Active, and stayed for a while as Marsden's guests. Whilst in Parramatta, the chiefs learned the "arts and institutions of the Pākehā," and paid special attention to European agricultural methods. Te Morenga was profoundly impressed by the benefits of European civilisation, however, asked that the missionaries teach these things only to the chiefs and their sons, as he stated that people from a lower caste would not be able to improve their conditions and their education would be wasted.

In 1820, Marsden sent James Shepherd to live with Te Morenga and Te Uri Kāpana at Taiāmai and teach them agriculture. Later that year, Te Morenga travelled with Marsden as far south as Tauranga aboard the Coromandel and west to Kaipara. Also in 1820, Te Morenga passed through Whangaruru with Marsden and John Butler, bringing the area to their attention.

Although Te Morenga led several taua into battle, he still maintained a strong relationship with the missionaries. He became friendly with Henry Williams, and it is mentioned in Williams' journals that he had many meetings with 'Old More,' as Williams sometimes called Te Morenga. Te Morenga sold land at Pakaraka to Williams, who bought it for his sons to farm, and is still in the hands of Williams' descendants today.

== The Musket Wars ==
In 1807, Te Morenga fought with distinction in the Battle of Moremonui.

By 1819, Ngāpuhi was divided into three factions, who were all closely related and connected by marriage. The northern alliance was led by Hongi Hika, the southern alliance by Te Morenga and Pōmare I, and the western group by Moetara, Makoare Te Taonui, Eruera Maihi Patuone, and Tāmati Wāka Nene.

Te Morenga has been described as both an ally and rival of Hongi Hika during the Musket Wars. He served alongside Hongi when exacting utu for the Venus Incident and engaged in further battles as allies. However, there was a growing jealousy between Te Morenga and Hongi Hika. In December 1819, there was opening fighting between Hongi Hika's and Te Morenga's respective hapū over a potato crop at Kerikeri. After his battle with Te Waru, Te Morenga offered a large waka as a peace offering to Hongi, who had just returned from England.

Te Morenga began to grow wary of the inter-tribal conflicts, and, on his June 1820 travels with Samuel Marsden, he encouraged southern tribes to cease fighting, follow Christianity, and embrace civilisation. Te Morenga reconciled with former enemies, and then, with his fellow travellers, journeyed back to the Bay of Islands mainly on foot, arriving in September 1820.

Late in 1820, he attacked Mauinaina pā, but was repulsed. Te Morenga apparently indulged in the bodies of the dead. In June 1821, his brother, Te Koperu, was killed by Te Paraoa-rahi of Ngāti Pāoa. Seeking utu, and now with Hongi Hika's assistance, he attacked the pā again and reduced it in November 1821. Included in these invading forces was the Pākehā Māori Jacky Marmon, who had married into the family of Eruera Maihi Patuone. Later in December, they attacked Tōtara pā, and besieged it for several days. The invading taua looted the abandoned small villages and killed anyone they found on their raids. Ultimately, peace was made, however, this was deceitful. Ngāpuhi announced they would attack no further and departed via their waka. As the attacking chiefs left the pā, they pressed noses with the defending chiefs. Te Morenga reportedly whispered "kia tupoto" to an opposing chief. The words meant: "Beware — be on your guard!"

Turning inshore, Ngāpuhi hid at Tararu and prepared for a surprise attack. At the break of the following day, they attacked the pā again. It was a considerable Ngāpuhi victory, with little casualties for the attackers. On the other hand, for the pā's occupants, hundreds of men were killed, with the women and children being taken prisoner. Two young chiefs, Wetea and Tukehu, surrendered when a Ngāpuhi chief who knew them called their names. Knowing they were to be killed and eaten, Wetea asked to be allowed to sing his death song. After accepting, Ngāpuhi was moved and asked that Hongi Hika spare the two chiefs' lives. Hongi, who had lost his son-in-law, Tete, in the battle, rejected and promptly stabbed Wetea in the bosom, cut off a chunk of his breast, roasted it, and then ate it. Wetea then taunted Hongi by asking "Is this the worst a great warrior like you can do?" After hearing this, Hongi drove his weapon through Wetea's throat and drank the blood from it until the chief was dead. Tukehu also suffered the same fate. Te Morenga, Te Wera, Te Whareumu, and others were disgusted by Hongi's treachery and decided to separate from him on their subsequent travels.

Following this, Te Morenga supported Hongi on his Rotorua expedition. In the following year, he joined Pōmare I in his invasion of Te Urewera and Ngāti Awa. Instead of joining Pōmare on his way to Ruatahuna, Te Morenga travelled up the Waiotahe and Waioweka Rivers with a smaller invading force. Around this time, he had a dispute with Hongi, at the Bay of Islands, resulting in fighting between their respective hapū in the streets of the mission settlement. However, they were able to put aside their differences and Te Morenga took part in a campaign against Ngāti Whātua, which culminated in the Battle of Te Ika-a-ranga-nui. During the battle, Te Morenga was gravely insulted by another chief seducing his wife. In accordance with Māori custom at the time, the woman was killed and eaten, however, Te Morenga refused to eat her.

After this, Te Morenga stayed away from conflict and focused on wheat farming. This stayed this way until 5 March 1830, when Ururoa, brother-in-law to Hongi Hika, arrived with a large force and plundered the kūmara fields of Te Morenga and Pōmare, resulting in injuries sustained to the pair's wives. An accidental or untimely shot subsequently killed a woman, resulting in the beginning of a violent conflict. Peace was eventually made on 17 March, through the mediation of Samuel Marsden, ratified by Ururoa throwing a stick at the feet of Te Morenga. This event soon became known as the Girls' War.

== Later life, death, and legacy ==
Te Morenga lived at Taiāmai. According to Archdeacon Philip Walsh, it is said that Te Morenga's pā at Taiāmai was the last to be constructed. Te Morenga was one of the 13 rangatira that signed the 1831 letter to King William IV, which he signed under the name 'Tamoranga.' He is believed to have joined Tītore's taua to Tauranga in 1833. In his later years, Te Morenga was dedicated to European agriculture and the erection of flourmills at Taiāmai.

By 1833, he was in ill health and it is believed that, in 1834, he died at Whangaruru. Ethnologist Percy Smith considered him as probably the greatest Māori chief in the early part of the nineteenth century.

Te Morenga owned an axe made out of pounamu named Ara-toki. It is believed that the axe was placed in the prow of Te Morenga's waka during long journeys. Te Morenga's "special wife" would conceal the axe in the waka of her husband and call on taniwha to protect Te Morenga and his men from danger. The axe found itself in the hands of a Whangārei ethnological collecter, William Mackenzie Fraser. Fraser lent the axe to various ships, such as the Beth and Port Waikato to be used as a talisman on their voyages.

== Confusion with Haare Nepia Te Morenga ==
Whilst Te Morenga is believed to have died in 1834, a Te Morenga signed He Whakaputanga on 12 July 1837, under the iwi Te Rarawa. The Ministry for Culture and Heritage state that perhaps the son of Te Morenga of Ngāpuhi, Kihiringi Te Morenga signed on behalf of his father. However, in a Waitangi Tribunal report, Haami Piripi, a descendent of Haare Nepia Te Morenga of Te Rarawa, claims that Haare Nepia signed He Whakaputanga. Piripi also asserted that Haare Nepia was the son of Wharewhare and Te Marino, and had a son, Kihiringi Te Morenga.

There is a lack of information to properly distinguish between the two, with the National Library of New Zealand and the Ministry for Culture and Heritage stating that Te Morenga was also of Te Rarawa.
