= Girls' War =

1830 New Zealand Māori tribal conflict

The Girls' War is the name given to fighting on the beach at Russell, New Zealand, then known as Kororāreka, in March 1830 between the northern and southern hapū (subtribe) within the Ngāpuhi iwi (tribe).

== The cause ==
The Girls' War is so named because it began with insults and curses being exchanged between young, high-ranking Māori women, rivals for the affection of Captain William Darby Brind. Te Urumihia, the wife of Kiwikiwi of the Ngati Manu hapū and the chief of Kororāreka, whose daughter was involved in the incident, cursed Brind's women. These included Pehi, the daughter of Hongi Hika, and Moewaka, the daughter of Rewa, a chief of the Ngai Tawake hapū, of Kerikeri. The exchange of insults and curses escalated into fighting between warriors, as the Māori believed, as described by Carlton, “that every individual of a tribe must be supported, right or wrong, against offence”.

== The fighting ==
In response to the curses, Ururoa (also known as Rewharewha), a chief of Whangaroa and brother-in-law of the late Hongi Hika, led warriors to raid the kūmara gardens of the Ngati Manu on 5 March 1830. Ururoa was supported by other chiefs from the various northern hapū within the Ngāpuhi, including Tītore and Hone Heke. The warriors of Kiwikiwi, Te Morenga and Pōmare II (originally called Whiria, also called Whetoi, nephew of Pōmare I) defended Kororāreka.

Tohitapu, a Tohunga, sought the assistance of the CMS missionaries to mediate between the combatants. The Reverends Henry Williams, William Williams and other missionaries came over the bay from Paihia to attempt to mediate an end to the fighting. The mediation efforts appeared promising with the missionaries believing that the chiefs would accept that the plunder of the kūmara gardens at Korarareka would suffice as satisfaction of the earlier insults. However, during the morning of 6 March, a musket was fired by accident, wounding a woman in Ururoa's party. A battle commenced which Hengi, a chief of Whangaroa, attempted to stop; however he was shot and killed, his death having consequences in the months and years ahead. About 1,400 warriors were involved in the battle, with about 100 being killed.

== The consequences ==
Eventually Henry Williams persuaded the warriors to stop the fighting. Reverend Samuel Marsden had arrived on a visit and over the following weeks he and Henry Williams attempted to negotiate a settlement in which Kororāreka would be ceded by Pōmare II as compensation for Hengi's death, which was accepted by those engaged in the fighting. However, the duty of seeking revenge had passed to Mango and Kakaha, the sons of Hengi; they took the view that the death of their father should be acknowledged through a muru, or compensation-seeking expedition, against tribes to the south. It was within Māori traditions to conduct a muru against tribes who had no involvement in the events that caused the death of an important chief.

Mango and Kakaha did not commence the muru until January 1832. Tītore led the expedition. The Revd. Henry Willams accompanied the warriors, without necessarily believing that he could end the fighting, but with the intention of continuing to persuade the combatants as to Christian teaching of peace and goodwill. The journal of Henry Williams provides an extensive account of this expedition, which can be described as an incident in the so-called Musket Wars. The Ngāpuhi warriors were successful in fights on the Mercury Islands and Tauranga, with the muru continuing until late July 1832.

The war did not end, as in February 1833 Tītore led a party of Te Rarawa, allies of the Ngāpuhi, from the North Cape back to Tauranga. Again Henry Williams accompanied the expedition in an attempt to bring it to a peaceful conclusion.

While the Girls' War describes the fighting at Kororāreka in March 1830, its consequences played out over the following years with the expeditions conducted by the Ngāpuhi against the Te Arawa at Tauranga.

In 1837 Pōmare II fought a three-month war with Tītore in the Bay of Islands. Hōne Heke fought with Tītore against Pōmare II. An underlying cause of the fighting was a dispute as to the boundary line of the Kororāreka block that had been surrendered as a consequence of the death of Hengi some seven years previously in the Girls’ War.

== Additional material ==
- Carleton, Hugh (1874) - The life of Henry Williams, Archdeacon of Waimate, Volume I. Auckland NZ. Online available from Early New Zealand Books (ENZB).
- Chisholm, Jocelyn (2009) - Brind Of The Bay Of Islands: Some Readings And Notes Of Thirty Years In The Life Of A Whaling Captain, (Paperback) ISBN 978-0-9597597-2-3
- Fitzgerald, Caroline (2011) - Te Wiremu - Henry Williams: Early Years in the North, Huia Publishers, New Zealand ISBN 978-1-86969-439-5
- Fitzgerald, Caroline (2004) - Letters from the Bay of Islands, Sutton Publishing Limited, United Kingdom; ISBN 0-7509-3696-7 (Hardcover). Penguin Books, New Zealand, (Paperback) ISBN 0-14-301929-5
- Rogers, Lawrence M. (editor) (1961) - The Early Journals of Henry Williams 1826 to 1840. Christchurch : Pegasus Press. online available at New Zealand Electronic Text Centre (NZETC) (2011-06-27)
- Smith, S. Percy (1910) – Maori Wars of the Nineteenth Century, online available at NZETC
