= James Shepherd (missionary) =

Australian-born New Zealand settler

James Shepherd (1796–1882) was an Australian-born Wesleyan Christian missionary and settler in Northland, New Zealand. He was prominent in the early European community of the Bay of Islands, involved in construction of the Stone Store in Kerikeri, and involved in drafting of the first written Maori publications.

== Biography ==
Shepherd was born in New South Wales, the son of freed-convict parents James Shepherd (a horse thief) and Ann Thorn (transported for stealing silver spoons).

As a cadet at the Church Mission Society's Samuel Marsden, Shepherd was present when Marsden celebrated Christmas at the Bay of Islands in 1814. This celebration was the first known Christian service in New Zealand. Subsequently, Shepherd and his wife Harriet left Sydney and settle in New Zealand permanently in 1821, as Marsden selected him in NSW for his farming skills and his wife's nursing talents. Shepherd and his family settled first in 1820 on the land of Ngapuhi chief Te Morenga of Tai-a-mai, near Waimate North, then moved to church service at Keri Keri in 1833. There, he was asked to take charge of the existing store until the new building was completed, planting the gardens at Kemp House.

== Religious mission ==
Shepherd assisted Samuel Marsden's missions at Oihi and Te Puna near Kerikeri and Henry Williams' mission at Paihia. These first C.M.S. missionaries in New Zealand (William Hall, John King, Thomas Kendall, Francis Hall, John Butler, James Kemp and James Shepherd) met criticisms stating: "they did not convert one single Maori; their survival is attributed to Maoris' tolerance rather than missionary proselytizing".

== Contributions to Māori language ==
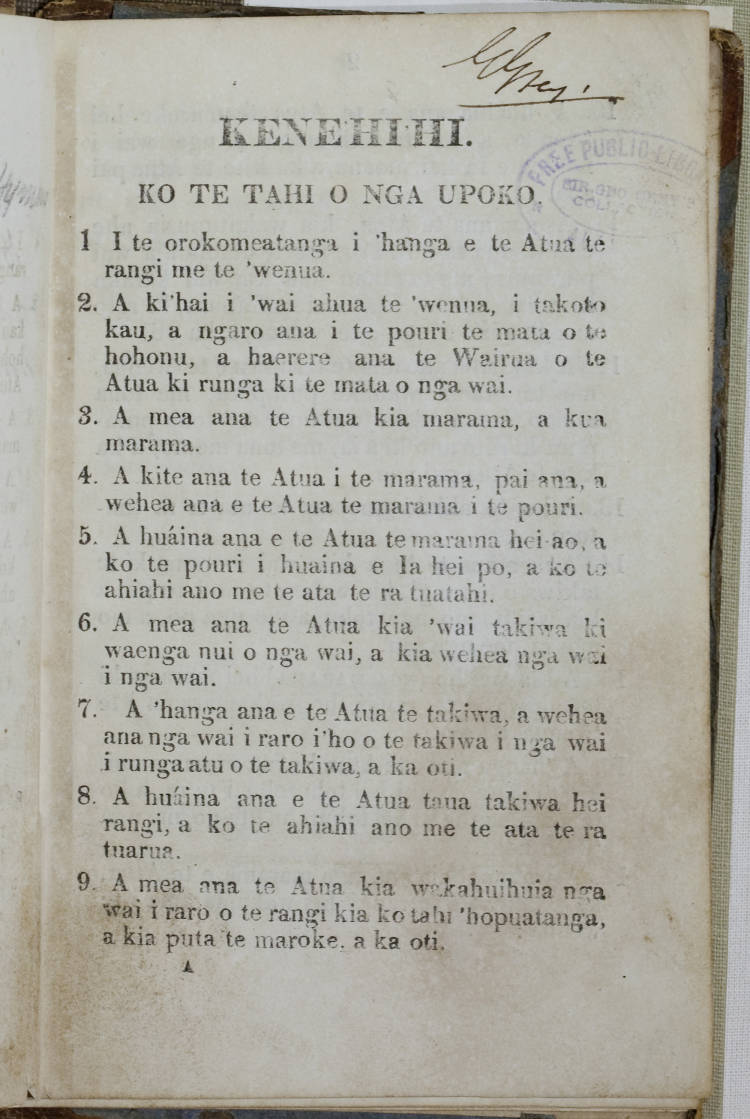
Opening page of 'Kenehihi. Ko te tahi o nga upoko', the first Maori-language version of the Bible, published 1870, editor James Shepherd CMS

As Shepherd was fluent in Maori, he wrote in Maori an account of the 'Creation, Fall and Recovery of man', then a translation of St. John's Gospel. Later, as a member of a team including William Gilbert Puckey, William Yate and William Williams, he contributed to the drafting of the first Maori language version of the Bible. This was the first time Te Reo was put into written form. A printed copy of Shepherd's translation of the “Book of Ruth” is currently displayed at Te Papa, Museum of New Zealand. Several of James Shepherds' children grew up at Waitangi fluent in Maori before they became fluent in English, and at least two (Isaac Shepherd and John Goodwin Shepherd) became government certified interpreters, with Isaac Shepherd active in that role during the NZ Wars in Taupo/King Country.

== Settlement ==
In 1836, Shepherd purchased a block of land at Tauranga, Whangaroa from James Kemp Tupe, From 1838, he settled permanently at his home named 'Waitangi' near the St James Anglican Church, Matangirau. He is also buried at Waitangi.
