= Myra Larcombe =

New Zealand police officer and swimming coach (1927–2022)

Myra Larcombe QSM
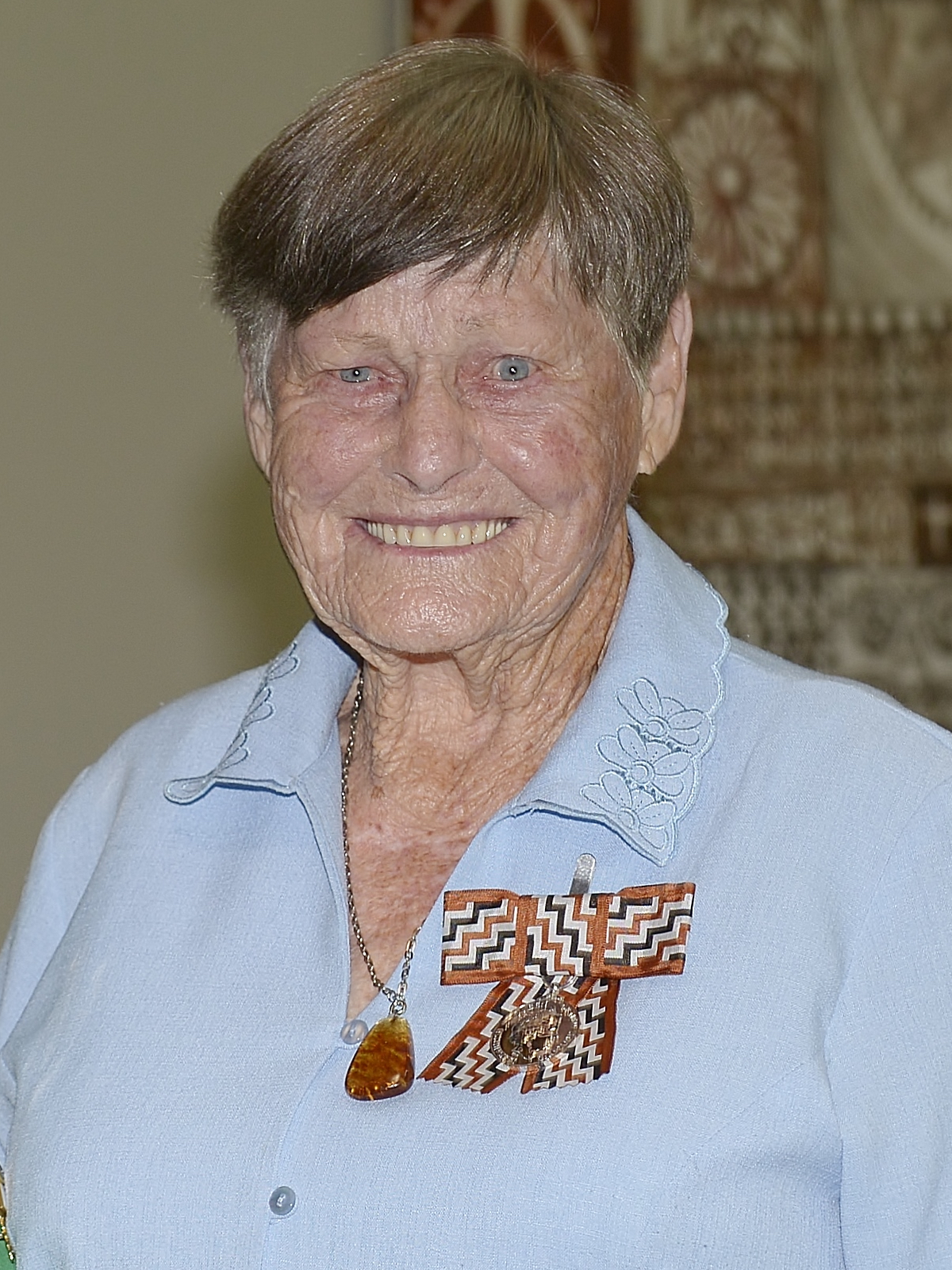
- Larcombe, 2018
- Born: Myra Beatrice Lane; 1 September 1927
- Died: 9 April 2022 (aged 94); Opua, New Zealand
- Occupations: Police officer; swimming coach; historian
- Children: 1

Myra Beatrice Larcombe QSM (née Lane; 1 September 1927 – 9 April 2022) was a New Zealand swimming coach, police officer and historian. She was a swimming coach for over 70 years, and was one of New Zealand's first female police officers in the 1950s.

== Early life and police career ==
Larcombe was born on 1 September 1927, and grew up on a farm on the Waikare Inlet, near Opua. She was one of four children, all of whom were good swimmers, and attended school in Kawakawa. In 1946 she began competing in swimming competitions and working as a swimming coach at Whangarei Swimming Club.

In 1951 she became one of the first female police officers in New Zealand, aged 23, and in 1954 became the first female police officer in Northland when she was transferred to Whangārei. The Northern Advocate reported on the occasion, noting that female police officers "possess the same authority as male constables and, if need be, can arrest a man". Describing the difficulties of being a female police officer in later life, she said: "It paid to be fitter than the men and to have acerbic wit. A number of new recruits left in a flood of tears. I was okay, could answer back and was extremely fit."

== Later career ==
After five years working as a police officer, Larcombe moved back to Opua to work with her father who was running a passenger boat service, and continued swimming coaching. In the early 1970s she was a founding member of the Kawakawa St John Ambulance station. In 1974 she co-founded the Bay of Islands Swimming Club, and later held various committee roles, being made a life member in 1980. As a masters swimmer she set New Zealand records, including in the 200m butterfly event at the 1997 Pan Pacific Swimming Championships and the 1998 FINA World Masters Championships (a record which stood until 2017). She stopped competing in the early 2000s after a shoulder replacement but continued to swim recreationally.

She was an amateur historian, with expertise in maritime history and the history of Opua. She and her younger sister kept records of ships visiting Opua; their records are held at the New Zealand Maritime Museum and were displayed at the Kawakawa Library in June 2021.

== Awards and legacy ==
In 2017, Larcombe received a lifetime achievement award at the Halberg Awards for her swimming coaching. She received a standing ovation at the event. In the 2018 New Year Honours, she received the Queen's Service Medal, for services to swimming. Other awards she received over her career included the Northland Masters Sportswoman of the Year (1999), Swim Coaches and Teachers of NZ Award for Services to Teaching Swimming (2001), a Sparc Lifetime Achievement Award (2004), a Sparc Northland Volunteer of the Year Award (2004) and a Far North District Services to Sport Award (2009).

Larcombe taught children to swim for over 70 years, and at the time of receiving the Queen's Service Medal was continuing to teach aqua exercise classes and work as a Top Energy WaterSafe instructor for schools in the Bay of Islands region. In her later years she taught the grandchildren of students she taught early in her career.

Larcombe died on 9 April 2022, survived by her daughter and four grandchildren. A farewell service was held at Opua School. In addition to teaching the school's students to swim for many years, Larcombe had opened the school's pool in 1969, published a booklet celebrating the school's centenary in 1986, and together with the principal compiled a further booklet in 2011 for the school's 125th anniversary.
