= Te Haumi =

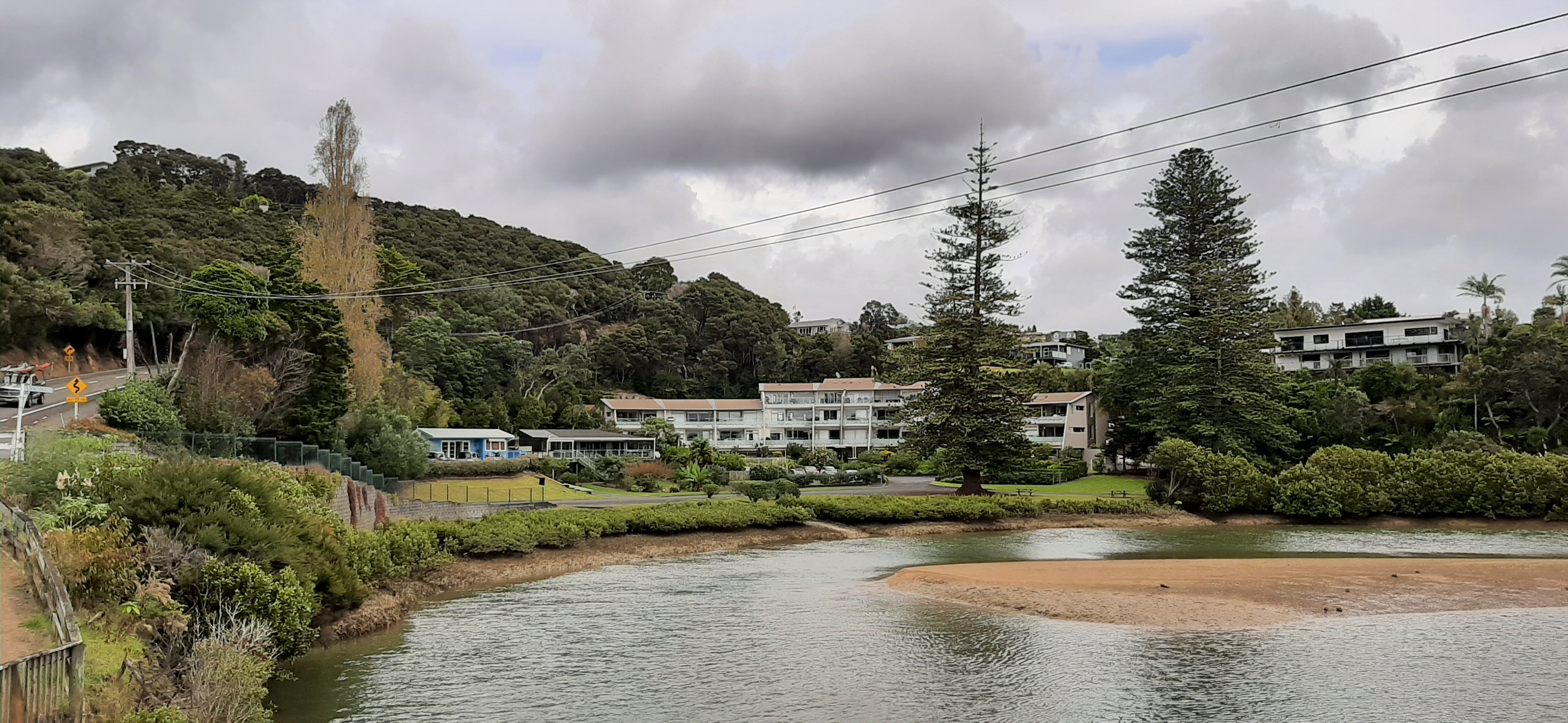
- Interactive map of Te Haumi
- Coordinates: 35.3019°S 174.0985°E
- Region: Northland Region
- District: Far North District
- Ward: Bay of Islands-Whangaroa Ward
- Community: Bay of Islands-Whangaroa
- Subdivision: Paihia
- Electorates: Northland; Te Tai Tokerau

Government
  - Territorial Authority: Far North District Council
  - Regional council: Northland Regional Council
  - Mayor of Far North: Moko Tepania
  - Northland MP: Grant McCallum
  - Te Tai Tokerau MP: Mariameno Kapa-Kingi

Area
  - Total: 0.63 km^{2} (0.24 sq mi)

Population (2023 Census)
  - Total: 417
  - Density: 660/km^{2} (1,700/sq mi)

Te Haumi is a settlement south-east of Paihia and north-west of Opua in the Bay of Islands area of Northland Region, New Zealand.

The Rangatira (Chief) Tohitapu lived at Te Haumi until his death in 1833. He is remembered in the naming of Tohitapu Road.

== Demographics ==
Te Haumi is in three SA1 statistical areas which cover 0.63 km^{2} (0.24 sq mi). The SA1 areas are part of the larger Opua statistical area.

Historical population
Year	Pop.	±% p.a.
2006	390	—
2013	360	−1.14%
2018	378	+0.98%
2023	417	+1.98%

Te Haumi had a population of 417 in the 2023 New Zealand census, an increase of 39 people (10.3%) since the 2018 census, and an increase of 57 people (15.8%) since the 2013 census. There were 210 males, 201 females and 3 people of other genders in 177 dwellings. 1.4% of people identified as LGBTIQ+. There were 45 people (10.8%) aged under 15 years, 39 (9.4%) aged 15 to 29, 177 (42.4%) aged 30 to 64, and 150 (36.0%) aged 65 or older.

People could identify as more than one ethnicity. The results were 89.2% European (Pākehā); 12.9% Māori; 2.2% Pasifika; 5.0% Asian; 0.7% Middle Eastern, Latin American and African New Zealanders (MELAA); and 1.4% other, which includes people giving their ethnicity as "New Zealander". English was spoken by 97.8%, Māori language by 2.9%, and other languages by 15.1%. No language could be spoken by 2.9% (e.g. too young to talk). The percentage of people born overseas was 30.9, compared with 28.8% nationally.

Religious affiliations were 27.3% Christian, 1.4% Buddhist, and 0.7% other religions. People who answered that they had no religion were 61.9%, and 6.5% of people did not answer the census question.

Of those at least 15 years old, 57 (15.3%) people had a bachelor's or higher degree, 189 (50.8%) had a post-high school certificate or diploma, and 102 (27.4%) people exclusively held high school qualifications. 18 people (4.8%) earned over $100,000 compared to 12.1% nationally. The employment status of those at least 15 was that 138 (37.1%) people were employed full-time, 42 (11.3%) were part-time, and 3 (0.8%) were unemployed.
