= Haumi River =

Coordinates: 35.298031°S 174.099531°E

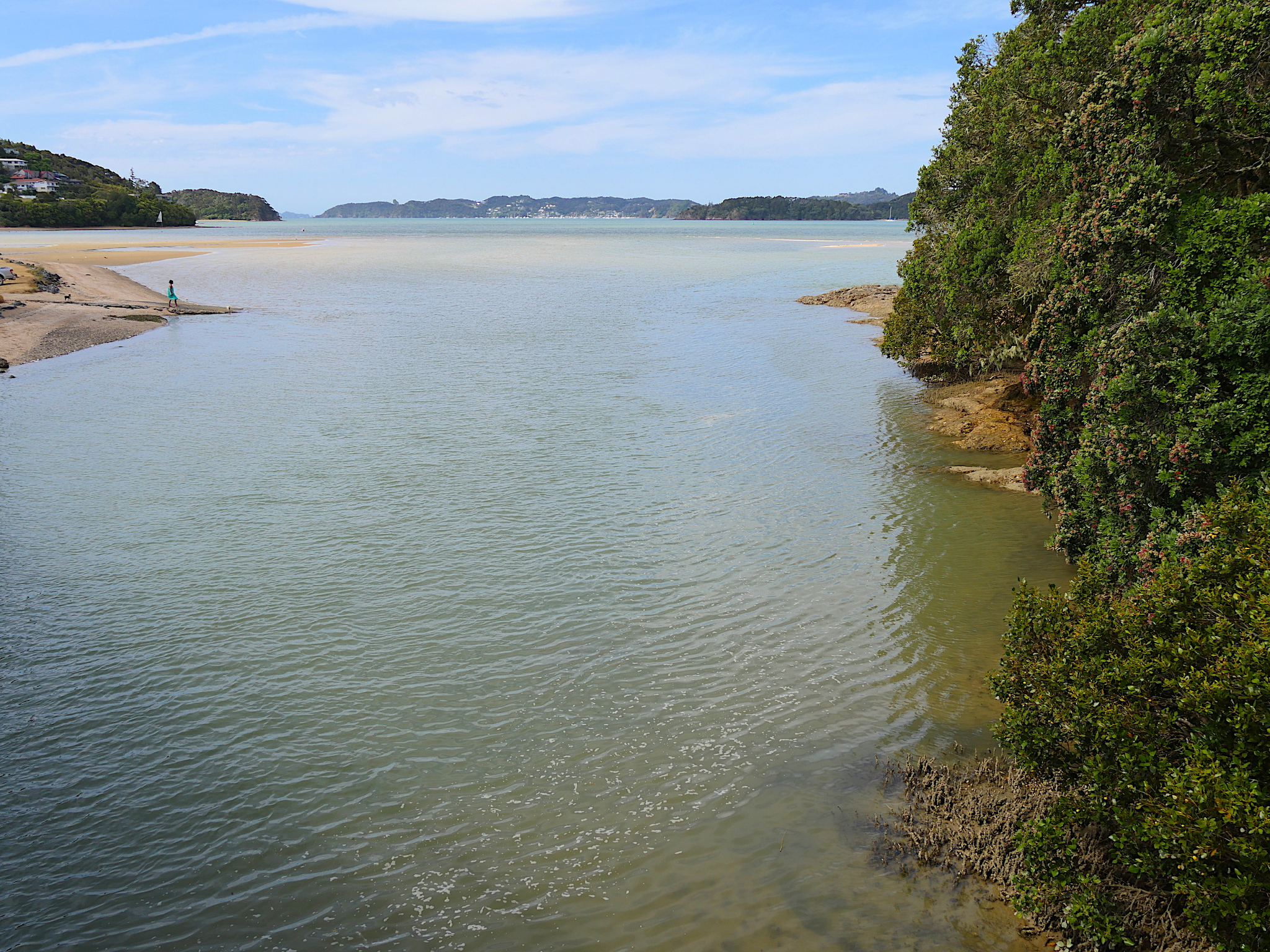

Location
- Country: New Zealand

Physical characteristics
- Mouth
  - location: Bay of Islands

The Haumi River is a river of the Northland Region of New Zealand. It flows into the Bay of Islands immediately south of Paihia.
