= Opua =

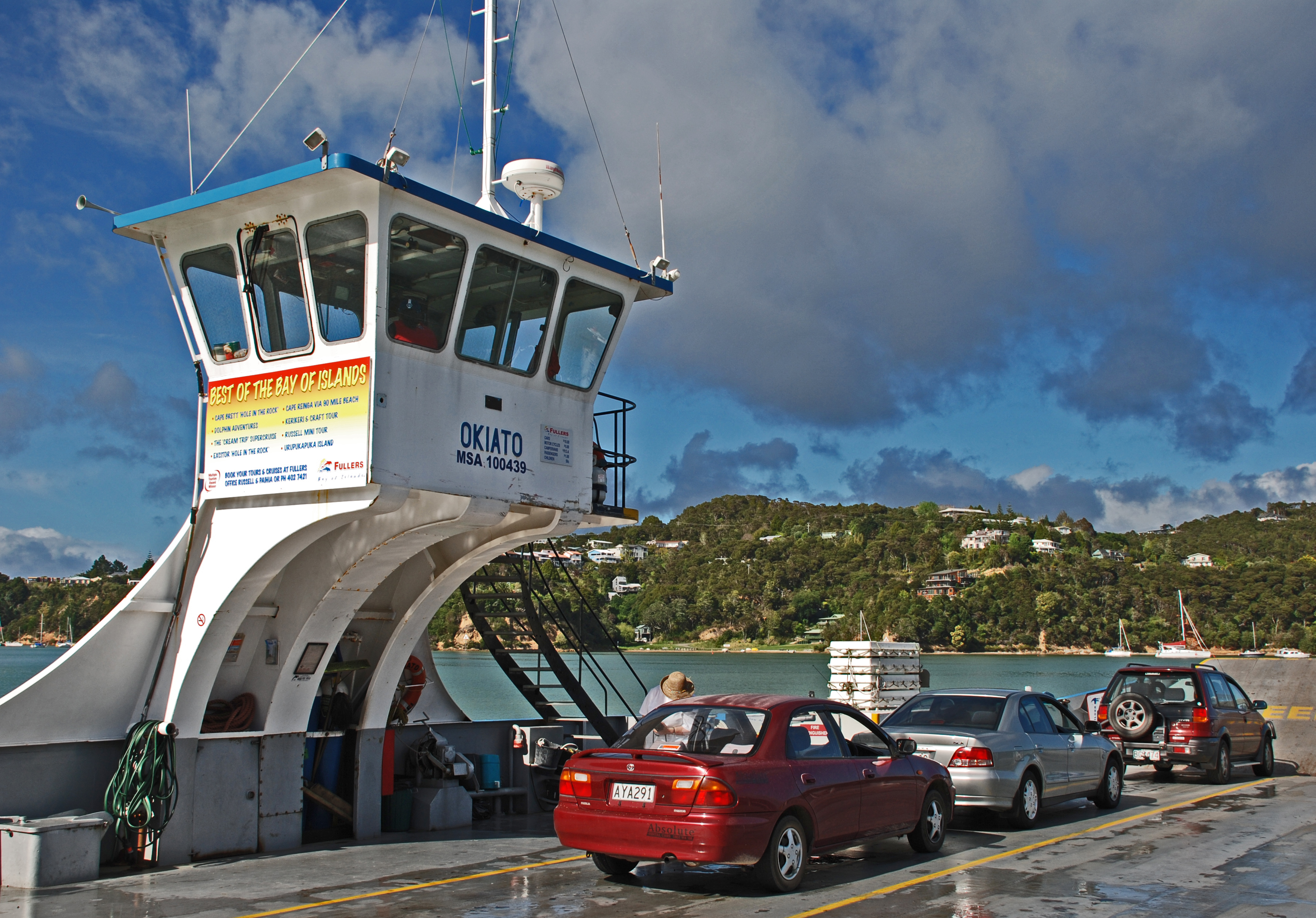
- Ferry between Opua and Okiato, Bay of Islands, New Zealand, with Opua in the distance
- Interactive map of Opua
- Coordinates: 35°18′51″S 174°7′7″E
- Country: New Zealand
- Region: Northland Region
- District: Far North District
- Ward: Bay of Islands-Whangaroa Ward
- Community: Bay of Islands-Whangaroa
- Subdivision: Russell-Ōpua
- Electorates: Northland; Te Tai Tokerau

Government
  - Territorial Authority: Far North District Council
  - Regional council: Northland Regional Council
  - Mayor of Far North: Moko Tepania
  - Northland MP: Grant McCallum
  - Te Tai Tokerau MP: Mariameno Kapa-Kingi

Area
  - Total: 5.60 km^{2} (2.16 sq mi)

Population (June 2025)
  - Total: 1,250
  - Density: 223/km^{2} (578/sq mi)

Opua is a locality in the Bay of Islands, in the sub-tropical Northland Region of New Zealand. It is notable as the first port for overseas yachts arriving in the country after crossing the Pacific Ocean. In the original 1870s plans for the town, it was named Newport. The town of Paihia is nearby, and the small settlement of Te Haumi is in between.

The car ferry across the Bay of Islands, the main tourist access to Russell, runs between Opua and Okiato.

The New Zealand Ministry for Culture and Heritage gives a translation of "place of the flower" for Ōpua.

The Waimangaro area north-west of Opua is listed on the Ngāpuhi and Te Puni Kōkiri websites as a traditional meeting point of the Ngāpuhi hapū of Te Uri Ongaonga.

== Demographics ==
Opua, including Te Haumi to the north, covers 5.60 km^{2} (2.16 sq mi) and had an estimated population of 1,250 as of June 2025, with a population density of 223 people per km^{2}.

Historical population
Year	Pop.	±% p.a.
2006	1,107	—
2013	1,020	−1.16%
2018	1,149	+2.41%
2023	1,248	+1.67%

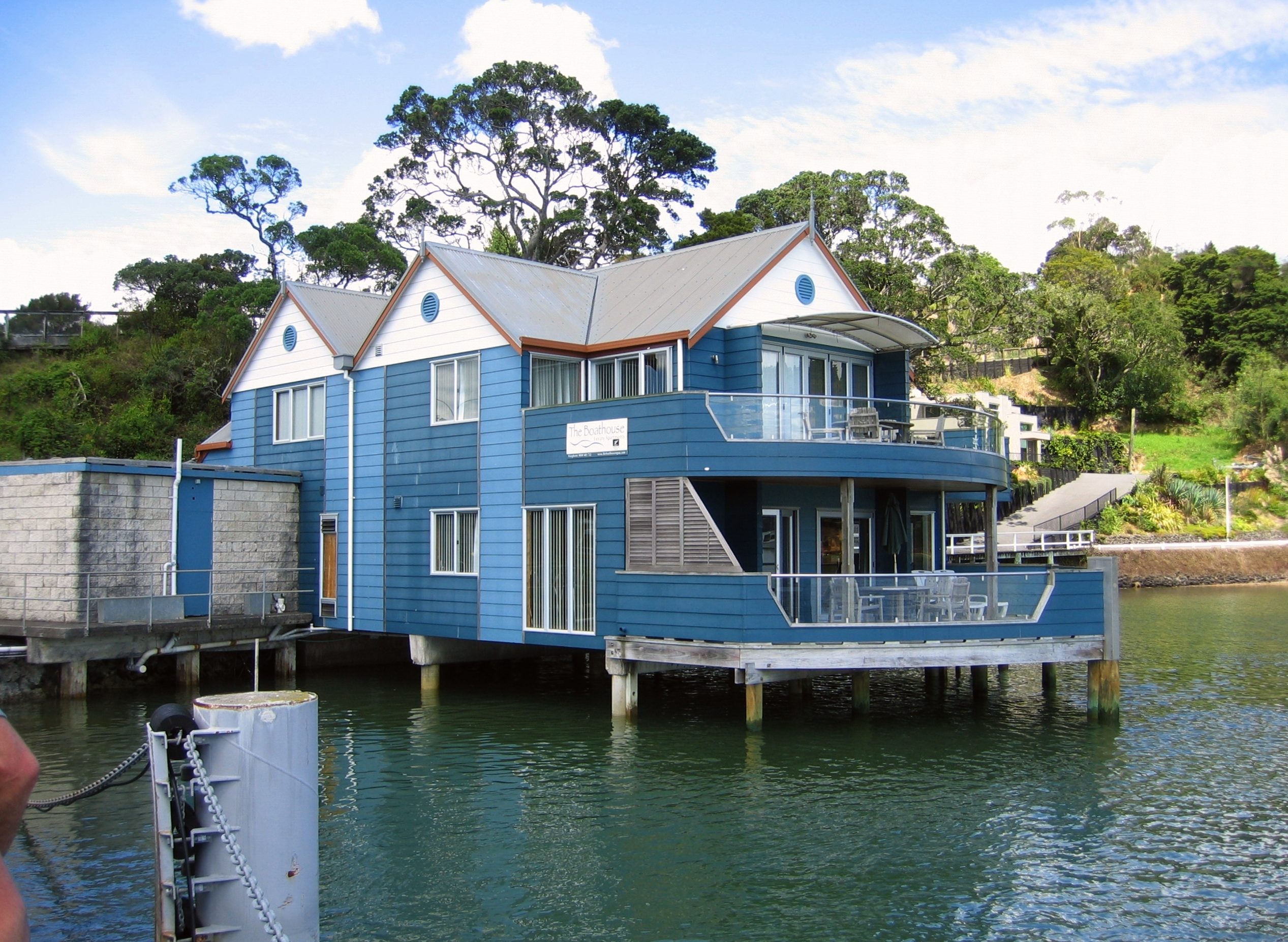
House on the Water at Opua

Ōpua had a population of 1,248 in the 2023 New Zealand census, an increase of 99 people (8.6%) since the 2018 census, and an increase of 228 people (22.4%) since the 2013 census. There were 624 males and 621 females in 570 dwellings. 2.4% of people identified as LGBTIQ+. The median age was 56.2 years (compared with 38.1 years nationally). There were 144 people (11.5%) aged under 15 years, 129 (10.3%) aged 15 to 29, 552 (44.2%) aged 30 to 64, and 423 (33.9%) aged 65 or older.

People could identify as more than one ethnicity. The results were 86.3% European (Pākehā); 18.8% Māori; 1.4% Pasifika; 4.6% Asian; 0.5% Middle Eastern, Latin American and African New Zealanders (MELAA); and 1.9% other, which includes people giving their ethnicity as "New Zealander". English was spoken by 97.1%, Māori language by 4.3%, and other languages by 13.0%. No language could be spoken by 1.9% (e.g. too young to talk). The percentage of people born overseas was 32.0, compared with 28.8% nationally.

Religious affiliations were 22.8% Christian, 0.7% Hindu, 1.4% Māori religious beliefs, 0.5% Buddhist, 0.5% New Age, and 1.7% other religions. People who answered that they had no religion were 65.4%, and 7.2% of people did not answer the census question.

Of those at least 15 years old, 186 (16.8%) people had a bachelor's or higher degree, 579 (52.4%) had a post-high school certificate or diploma, and 279 (25.3%) people exclusively held high school qualifications. The median income was $34,500, compared with $41,500 nationally. 93 people (8.4%) earned over $100,000 compared to 12.1% nationally. The employment status of those at least 15 was that 447 (40.5%) people were employed full-time, 147 (13.3%) were part-time, and 24 (2.2%) were unemployed.

== Port of entry ==
Opua is New Zealand's northernmost port of entry for overseas vessels, and a Customs and Ministry for Primary Industries Place of First Arrival. It is a popular destination for cruising yachts owing to its sheltered, deep water anchorage, and numerous facilities for cruisers, including the 250-berth Opua Marina, Ashby's Boatyard and Opua Cruising Club.

== Railway ==
The Opua Branch, a branch line railway sometimes considered part of the North Auckland Line, formerly served the town. The first railway link, from Opua to Kawakawa, opened on 7 April 1884. When the North Auckland Line was completed in 1925, a thrice weekly passenger express train called the Northland Express operated directly to Opua from Auckland. In November 1956, this was replaced by a railcar service run by RM class 88 seaters, but this service terminated at the other northern terminus, Ōkaihau on the Okaihau Branch. Opua passengers thus had to use mixed trains that carried freight as well as passengers; these trains ceased on 18 June 1976 when the line became freight-only. As Opua's use as a commercial port declined, so did the freight traffic on the railway, and it was last used in 1985.

The line was then leased to the Bay of Islands Vintage Railway, who have operated tourist services between Opua and Kawakawa, with a break when the Land Transport Safety Authority withdrew the line's operating licence. Part of the line in Opua is now on private land, and restoration by the vintage railway trust is proceeding.

== Education ==
The local primary school, Opua School, is a coeducational full primary (years 1–8, with 5 classrooms) school with a roll of 97 students as of July 2026. The school was established in 1886. It has an open and easy-going policy of enrolling the children of overseas families mooring in the Bay for weeks or months at a time – making it a highly international school for a small community.

== Notable people ==
- Myra Larcombe (1927–2022), swimming coach and police officer
- Harold Rushworth (1880–1950), politician and farmer
