= Te Rangi-i-paia II =

Te Rangi-i-paia II (fl. 1818–1829) was a New Zealand tribal leader. Of Māori descent, she identified with the Ngāti Porou iwi. She was born in Tokomaru Bay, East Coast, New Zealand in and active from about 1818.
