= Pōmare I (Ngāpuhi) =

New Zealand Māori leader (died 1826)

Pōmare I (died 1826) was a New Zealand Māori rangatira (chief) of the Ngāti Manu hapū (subtribe) of the Ngāpuhi iwi (tribe). Formerly called Whētoi, he adopted the name of Pōmare, after the name of the king of Tahiti who had converted to Christianity. After his death he was called Pōmarenui ('Pōmare the Great') by Ngāti Manu in order to distinguish him from his nephew Whiria, who also took the name Pōmare.

The Ngāti Manu originally lived at Tautoro, south of Kaikohe, however disputes with the Ngāti Toki (Ngāti Wai) in Pōmare’s lifetime forced them to move and settle at Kororāreka, Matauwhi, Ōtūihu, Waikare and Te Kāretu on the southern shore of the Bay of Islands. Pōmare I established a pā at Matauwhi, near Kororāreka (now Russell), in what is now called Pōmare Bay.

Following the death of Pōmare I in 1826, his nephew Whiria adopted his uncle’s names, Whētoi and Pōmare, so Whiria is referred to as Pōmare II.

== Relations with the Church Missionary Society (CMS) ==
The Church Missionary Society (CMS) arrived in the Bay of Islands in 1814. Pōmare supplied food and timber to the missionaries.

He traded timber for tools and he also traded timber for muskets to provided security against the northern hapū within the Ngāpuhi, which was led by Hongi Hika, Tāreha, Ruatara, and Rewa (Manu) a chief of the Ngāti Tawake hapū of Kerikeri. At this time there was fighting between the hapū of the Ngāpuhi as well as intertribal fighting (known as the Musket Wars). The Rev. Henry Williams was appointed the leader of the CMS mission in 1823. He stopped the CMS trading muskets with the Ngāpuhi. However other Europeans continued to trade muskets with the Ngāpuhi and other Māori tribes.

The missionaries regarded Pōmare as one of the important leaders in the Bay of Islands, together with Hongi Hika, Te Whareumu and Rākau. In July 1815 Pōmare went to visit Port Jackson (Sydney) in the missionary vessel Active.

== Pōmare I as a war leader ==
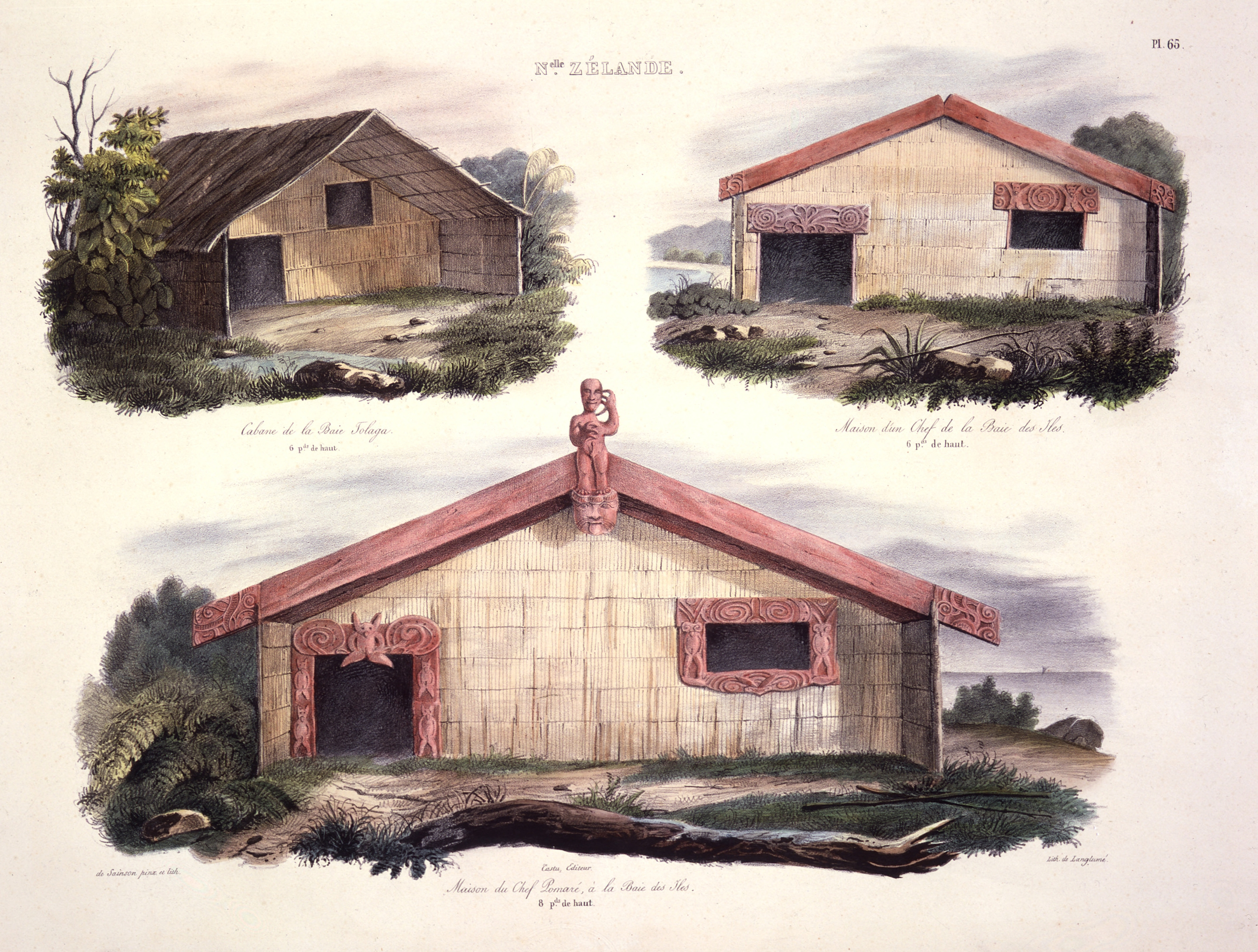
Pōmare's house (bottom) depicted by Louis Auguste de Saison after he visited on Astrolabe in March 1827, months after Pōmare died

Pōmare I led a number of war parties against other Māori tribes:

- In 1820 he engaged in a six-month siege of Te Whetū-matarau pā at Te Kawakawa (Te Araroa) in the East Cape region of the North Island. When the pā fell, he captured Te Rangi-i-paia, the highest-ranking person, and made her his wife;
- In 1821 he joined Hongi Hika in the attack on the Ngāti Pāoa at the Mau-inaina pā at Mokoia (Panmure) between the Waitematā and Manukau Harbours; then the Ngāpuhi attached the Ngāti Maru of Te Totara pā, in the Thames area;
- In 1822 he led an attack on the Nga-uhi-a-po pā on Tuhua (Mayor Island), and then pursued the Ngāti Awa of the eastern Bay of Plenty, up the Whakatāne River valley and into Te Urewera, the land of the Ngāi Tūhoe;
- In 1823 he joined Hongi Hika in the attack on Te Arawa on Mokoia Island in Lake Rotorua. A dispute arose between Pōmare I and Hongi Hika over the conduct of the attack;
- In 1824 he attacked the Ngāti Whātua of the Kaipara. Later that year he joined Te Mautaranui of Te Urewera and attacked Wairoa and took the Titirangi pā near Lake Waikaremoana;
- In 1826 Pōmare I was killed during a raid in the Waikato.

== Legacy ==
The death of Tiki, the son of Pōmare I, and the subsequent death of Te Whareumu in 1828 threw the Hokianga into a state of uncertainty as the Ngāpuhi chiefs debated whether revenge was necessary following the death of a chief. The Rev. Henry Williams, Richard Davis and the chief Tohitapu mediated between the combatants. As the chiefs did not want to escalate the fighting, a peaceful resolution was achieved.

Pōmare I was succeeded as leader of the Ngāti Manu hapū by his nephew, Whiria, who took his uncle’s names, Whetoi and Pōmare.

== Bibliography ==
- Tarakawa, Takaanui (1899). "Nga Mahi A Te Wera, Me Nga-Puhi Hoki, Ki Te Tai-Rawhiti / The Doings of Te Wera-Hauraki and Nga-Puhi, on the East Coast, N.Z". Journal of the Polynesian Society. 8: 179–187, 235–249.
- Tarakawa, Takaanui (1900). "Nga mahi a Te Wera, me Nga-Puhi hoki, ki Te Tai-Rawhiti/ The Doings of Te Wera and Nga-Puhi on the East Coast". Journal of the Polynesian Society. 9: 47–62, 65–84, 135–141.
