= Tītore =

Māori political leader (c. 1775–1837)

- Born: c. 1775
- Died: 2 June 1837 (aged 62); Kororāreka, Bay of Islands, United Tribes of New Zealand
- Cause of death: Illness or battle wounds
- Burial place: Bay of Islands
- Spouse: Matire-taku
- Relatives: Hongi Hika (brother-in-law); Te Ahi and Hapai (parents)
- Military career
- Allegiance: Ngāpuhi; United Tribes of New Zealand
- Service years: 1790s–1837
- Rank: Rangatira
- Nicknames: Tītore Paki, Tītore Tākiri
- Conflicts: Girls' War; Ngāpuhi invasion of Tāmaki

Tītore (c. 1775–1837), sometimes known as Tītore Tākiri, was a rangatira (chief) of the Ngāpuhi iwi (tribe). He was a war leader of the Ngāpuhi who led the war expedition against the Māori tribes at East Cape in 1820 and 1821. He also led the war expeditions to Tauranga and Maketu in 1832 and 1833, following the Girls' War incident at Kororāreka in the Bay of Islands.

He was the son of Hāpai, the grandson of Toko, and the brother of Rapu. Tītore was the nephew of Tāreha, principal rangatira of the Ngāti Rēhia hapū (sub-tribe) of Kerikeri, and he was related to Hōne Heke and Hengi of Ngāti Rēhia. He married a sister of Hongi Hika. He lived near Whakataha pā in the Waimate North area, then at Kororāreka, as the peace settlement to the Girls' War resulted in his receiving Kororāreka as reparation for the death of his relation Hengi.

== Tītore's and Te Wera's southern expedition 1820–21 ==
In April 1821, Tītore and the chief Te Wera from Okura, near Kerikeri, returned to the Bay of Islands after 16 months of fighting against the tribes at Tolaga Bay and Poverty Bay on the East Coast of the North Island.

== Tītore’s war expeditions in 1832 and 1833 ==
In the peace settlement at the end of the Girls' War, Kororāreka (today known as Russell) was ceded to Tītore by Pōmare II as compensation for Hengi's death, which was accepted by those engaged in the fighting. However, the duty of seeking revenge had passed to Mango and Kakaha, the sons of Hengi; they took the view that the death of their father should be acknowledged through a muru, or war expedition, against tribes to the south. It was within Māori traditions to conduct a muru against tribes who had no involvement in the events that caused the death of an important chief.

Tītore did not commence the muru until January 1832. The Revd Henry Williams accompanied the first expedition, without necessarily believing that he could end the fighting, but with the intention of continuing to persuade the combatants as to the Christian message of peace and goodwill. The journal of Henry Williams provides an extensive account of this expedition, which can be described as an incident in the so-called Musket Wars. The Ngāpuhi warriors, who included Hōne Heke, were successful in battles on the Mercury Islands and at Tauranga, with the muru continuing until late July 1832.

In February 1833 Tītore consulted Tohitapu, a tohunga, to foresee the success of a second war expedition; then Tītore led a party of Te Rarawa, allies of the Ngāpuhi, back to Tauranga. Williams also accompanied the second expedition.

== Exchanging gifts with William IV ==
Tītore was one of 13 northern rangatira who signed a letter to King William IV in 1831, seeking an alliance with the United Kingdom; with a request to the King to become "friend and guardian of these Islands" to protect them from the "tribe of Marion", which is how the Māori of the Bay of Islands referred to the French. The Māori of the Bay of Islands were concerned about the French presence in the South Pacific as a consequence of the massacre of Marc-Joseph Marion du Fresne and 26 crewman, who were killed and cannibalized in the Bay of Islands in 1772.

In 1834, F.W.R. Sadler of HMS Buffalo received gifts from Tītore for delivery to the King, which included two mere made of pounamu (which is a symbol of chieftainship). In 1835, the King sent him a suit of armour, now in the Museum of New Zealand Te Papa Tongarewa.

== Declaration of Independence of the United Tribes of New Zealand ==
On 28 October 1835, Tītore signed He Whakaputanga o te Rangatiratanga o Nu Tirene (known in English as the Declaration of the Independence of New Zealand), which proclaimed the sovereign independence of New Zealand. The Declaration arose in response to concerns over the lawlessness of British subjects in New Zealand, and in response to a fear that France would declare sovereignty over the islands. The document also arose from movements in Māori society. From 1816 onwards, a number of Northern Māori chiefs had made visits to New South Wales and Norfolk Island, as well as to England, leading to discussions about unifying the tribes and the formation of a Māori government. Māori had become involved in trade with New South Wales and owned trading ships. In 1834, the chiefs had selected a flag for use on ships originating from New Zealand. In the process of signing, the chiefs established themselves as representing a confederation under the title of the "United Tribes of New Zealand".

== War with Pōmare II ==
Starting in March 1837, Pōmare II fought a three-month war with Tītore. Hōne Heke fought alongside Tītore.

Tītore lead 800 warriors in 42 war canoes against Pōmare's pā at Otuihu in the Bay of Islands, although the pā had strong defences and the attacks in March and April were repulsed. An underlying cause of the fighting was a dispute as to the boundary line of the Kororāreka block that had been surrendered as a consequence of the death of Hengi some seven years previously in the Girls’ War.

The war ended in June 1837 following the death of Tītore; however, it is not clear whether he died as the results of battle wounds or following an illness. Following Tītore's death, HMS Rattlesnake fired a formal salute in his honour.

== Literature and sources ==
- Carleton, Hugh (1874) – The life of Henry Williams, Archdeacon of Waimate, Volume I. Auckland NZ. Online available from Early New Zealand Books (ENZB).
- Carleton, Hugh (1877) – The life of Henry Williams, Archdeacon of Waimate, Volume II. Auckland NZ. Online available from Early New Zealand Books (ENZB).
- Fitzgerald, Caroline (2011) – Te Wiremu – Henry Williams: Early Years in the North, Huia Publishers, New Zealand ISBN 978-1-86969-439-5
- Fitzgerald, Caroline (2004) – Letters from the Bay of Islands, Sutton Publishing Limited, United Kingdom; ISBN 0-7509-3696-7 (Hardcover). Penguin Books, New Zealand, (Paperback) ISBN 0-14-301929-5
- Rogers, Lawrence M. (1973) – Te Wiremu: A Biography of Henry Williams, Christchurch : Pegasus Press
- Rogers, Lawrence M. (editor) (1961) – The Early Journals of Henry Williams 1826 to 1840. Christchurch : Pegasus Press. online available at New Zealand Electronic Text Centre (NZETC) (2011-06-27)
- Smith, S. Percy (1910) – Maori Wars of the Nineteenth Century, online available at NZETC
