= Te Ao-kapurangi =

Te Ao-kapurangi (fl. 1818–1830) was a notable New Zealand tribal leader and peacemaker. Of Māori descent, she identified with the Ngati Rangiwewehi and Te Arawa iwi. She was active from about 1818.
