= Te Whareumu =

Chief of Ngāti Manu

Te Whareumu (died 1828) was the ariki and warrior chief of Ngāti Manu, a hapū within the Ngāpuhi iwi based in the Bay of Islands in New Zealand.

Te Whareumu was the most important chief in the Kororakeka area in his day. He was a warrior chief of the highest mana in pre-European times and well respected by the early missionaries and traders, to whom he provided the greatest protection. Te Whareumu quickly realised the advantage of trading with the many ships visiting the Bay.

== Family ==
Born in the late 18th century (possibly about 1770–80) into a high ranking family, Te Whareumu was the son of Te Arahi and Te Ruru. He was closely related to Te Ruki Kawiti and Pōmare I (also called Whetoi) and related to most of the northern chiefs. Te Whareumu assumed control of the tribe after the passing of Tara. Also known as Uruti and 'King George'.

One of Te Whareumu's wives was Moehuri, daughter of Mohi Tawhai, an important chief of the Mahurehure tribe. Another wife was Whakakati, mother of Hori Kingi Tahua and at least three more children. He also married the wife of Tara, who was called Mrs Go-Shore, a term brought about from her boarding the ships in the harbour and telling them to come ashore.

== Te Ika-a-ranga-nui ==
Koriwhai of Ngāpuhi had been murdered by some members of the Ngāti Whātua and Ngāti Maru. This murder bought back memories of the defeat that Ngāpuhi had suffered at the Battle of Moremonui. So Hongi Hika decided to help Te Whareumu, to whom Koriwhai was related, and at the same time use the opportunity to wipe out their warlike neighbours of the Kaipara. So Ngapuhi assembled under Hongi Hika 500 strong and after the usual haka, the taua (war party) proceeded by way of the Mangakahia Valley. With them was the Te Roroa chief, Te Hihi-o-tote, who was related to Ngāpuhi and to Ngāti Whātua. Te Hihi managed to stop Hongi Hika from destroying his relatives by presenting the warrior with a fine old mere (greenstone weapon). Hongi Hika turned back and when Te Whareumu found out, he was very angry and immediately set out to sea with his own taua. He landed at Mangawhai with nearly 200 men and marched inland to confront the enemy. Meanwhile, Hongi Hika had started out again with 300 warriors overland, within this party were many different chiefs of Ngāpuhi, including Te Ahu, Patuone, Nene, Te Morenga and others.

The battle was fought in open land near a stream called Waimako, close to Kaiwaka.

The Ngāpuhi taua, led by Te Whareumu and Hongi Hika were armed with many muskets and Hongi must have looked impressive in his suit of armour, given to him by King George IV, on the other side of the field were the Ngāti Whātua tribe and allies, numbering over a 1,000 men, though they lacked the firepower of the Ngāpuhi combine. On spotting their rivals, the Ngāti Whātua launched a full assault met by Te Whareumu and his tribe, the fighting was fierce and bloody and just when it looked like the superior numbers of Ngāti Whātua would overwhelm them, in came Hongi Hika, the guns blazed unmercifully and Ngāti Whātua retreated to the forest edge, but they were rallied again by an old chief and once more charged the Ngāpuhi ranks, only to die in a rain of bullets. Then Te Whareumu and Hongi charged the Ngāti Whātua lines and the slaughter commenced, the bodies of over 700 Ngāti Whātua and their allies were spread all over the field and the remaining survivors fled for their lives, being chased all the way by members of Ngāpuhi. The slaughter was so great that the Waimako stream ran red with blood and while Ngāti Whātua suffered large losses, Ngāpuhi also lost several chiefs including Te Ahu, Te Puhi, and Hare Hongi (Hongi Hika's son). As the triumphant victors returned home they saw enemy heads stuck on posts by celebrating members and one captured woman was eaten at a certain point by members of Patuone and Nene's hapū, this was the last time those two participated in the eating of human flesh, such was the bloody nature of the time. Te Whareumu was well satisfied with his utu (revenge) but Hongi Hika went straight in to another fight with Ngati Pou at Whangaroa.

== Death ==
Te Whareumu was killed in 1828, in the Waimā district of the Hokianga, seeking utu (revenge) for the death of his relative Tiki, a son of Whetoi (aka Pomare I). The dispute involved Te Mahurehure, a tribe from South Hokianga and from which Te Whareumu's wife Mohuri was descended. This shows the complex nature of utu, when Tiki felt offended by the theft of some pigs by members of the Te Mahurehure tribe, he went to their land seeking redress, in this case, sweet potatoes and was shot while removing them. When news of Tikis death reached the Bay of Islands, a large taua was immediately assembled, Whiria (aka Pomare II) and his party reached the Waimā first and negotiated a deal, when Te Whareumu arrived he was most displeased and took to deriding the Waimā tribal leaders, especially Muriwai. Things quickly turned ugly and in the ensuing chaos, Te Whareumu was shot twice. On seeing the mighty leader fall, Patuone and Nene from the Hokianga took up his body and made great lamentations. In normal Maori tradition his body was cleaned and the bones placed in a secret burial cave. Hongi Hika had prophesied Te Whareumu's death, when on his own death bed just two weeks earlier, he said that Te Whareumu was shortly to follow.

Te Whareumu's death threw the whole area into a state of nervous tension as the other Bay leaders debated what revenge was required and the hapless missionaries tried valiantly to restore some kind of peace. Finally Patuone and others made peace with the Bay of Island tribes, with the assistance of the CMS missionaries.

Te Whareumu was survived by two of his wives and at least two children, a son, Hori Kingi Tahua and a daughter Kohu.
