= Takaanui Tarakawa =

New Zealand tohunga and historian (1852–1919)

Takaanui Hōhaia Tarakawa (1852 – 11 December 1919) was a notable New Zealand tohunga, historian, genealogist, and writer. Of Māori descent, he identified with the Ngāi Te Rangi, Ngāti Rangiwewehi, Tapuika and Te Arawa iwi and lived much of his life in the Bay of Plenty.

He was born in 1852 and grew up to be an expert in Māori lore, tradition and history. From the 1880s he was involved in dealings in the Native Land Court. He published papers in the Journal of the Polynesian Society, collaborating with S. Percy Smith.
