= Paihia =

Town in Northland Region, New Zealand

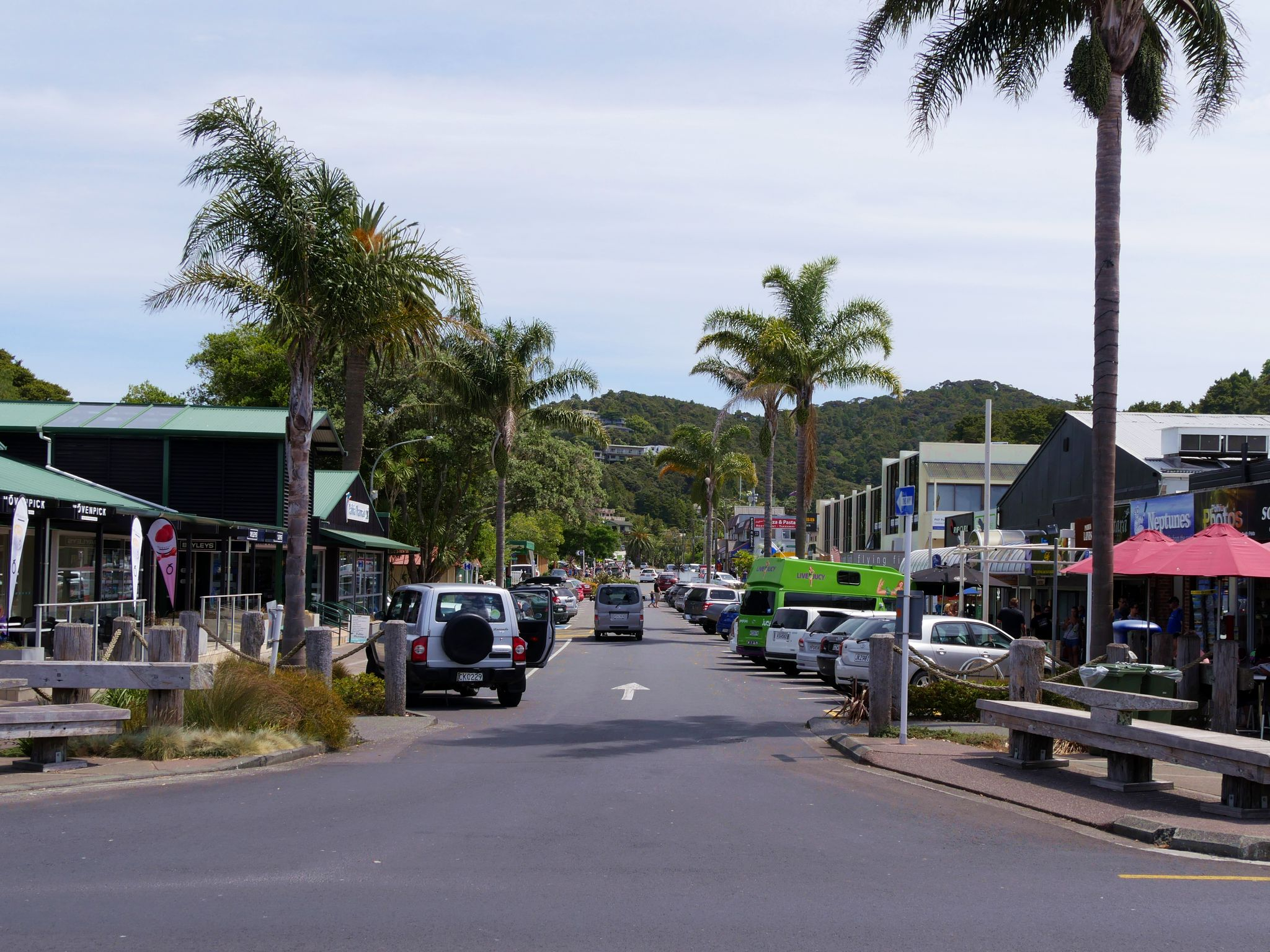
- Williams Road
- Interactive map of Paihia
- Coordinates: 35°16′56″S 174°5′28″E
- Country: New Zealand
- Region: Northland Region
- District: Far North District
- Ward: Bay of Islands-Whangaroa Ward
- Community: Bay of Islands-Whangaroa
- Subdivision: Paihia
- Electorates: Northland; Te Tai Tokerau

Government
  - Territorial Authority: Far North District Council
  - Regional council: Northland Regional Council
  - Mayor of Far North: Moko Tepania
  - Northland MP: Grant McCallum
  - Te Tai Tokerau MP: Mariameno Kapa-Kingi

Area
  - Total: 2.24 km^{2} (0.86 sq mi)

Population (June 2025)
  - Total: 1,640
  - Density: 732/km^{2} (1,900/sq mi)
- Postcode(s): 0200

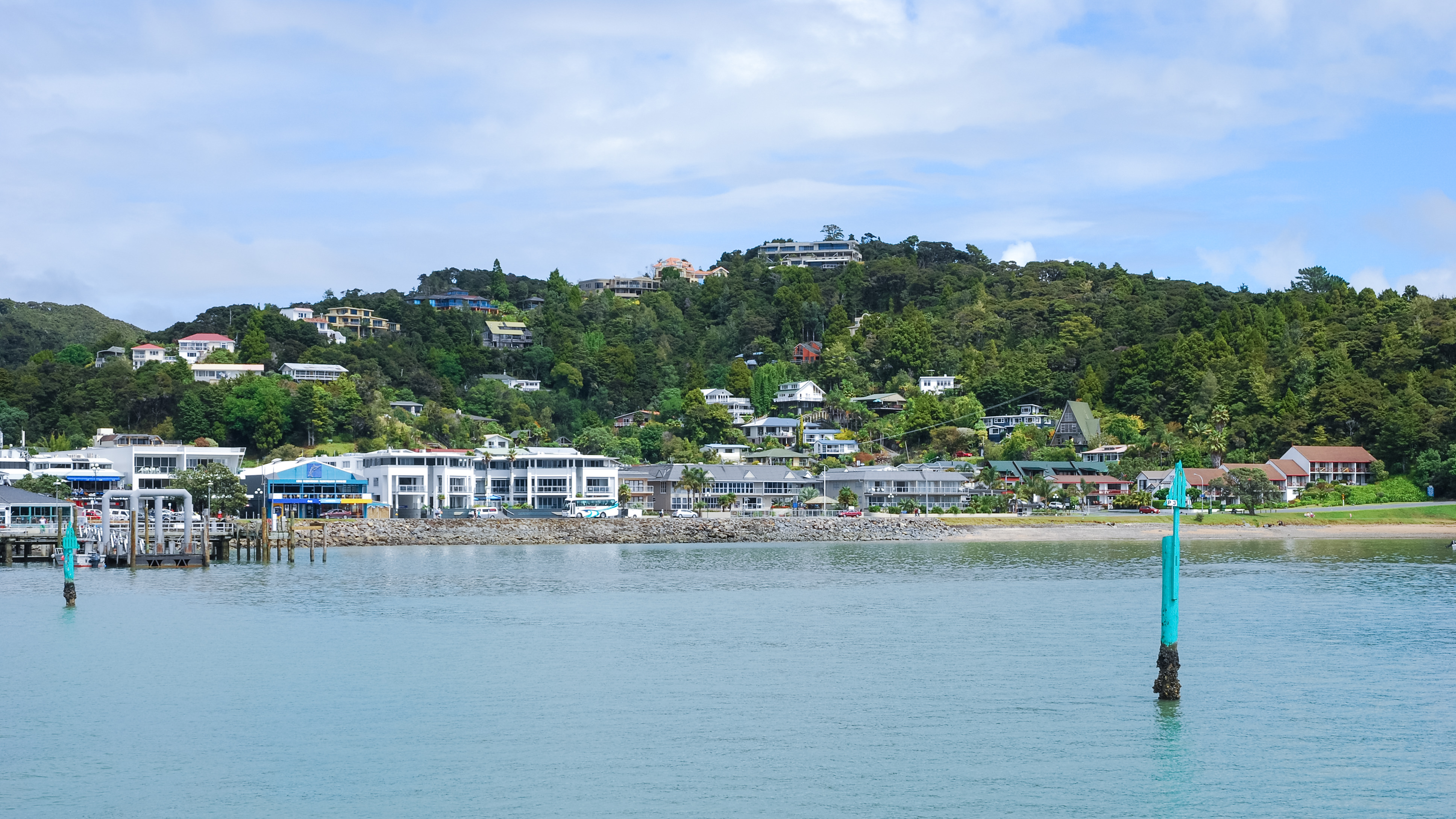
A view of Paihia from the ferry to Russell

Paihia is a town in the Bay of Islands in the Northland Region of the North Island of New Zealand. It is 60 kilometres north of Whangārei, located close to the historic towns of Russell and Kerikeri. Missionary Henry Williams named the mission station Marsden's Vale. Paihia eventually became the accepted name of the settlement.

Nearby to the north is the historic settlement of Waitangi, and the residential and commercial area of Haruru Falls is to the west. The port and township of Opua, and the small settlement of Te Haumi, lie to the south.

== History and culture ==
=== Origin of the Name ===
The origin of the name "Paihia" is unclear. A popular attribution, most likely apocryphal, is that when Reverend Henry Williams first arrived in the Bay of Islands searching for a location for his mission station, he told his Māori guide, "Pai here," meaning "Good here," as his Māori vocabulary was limited.

=== European settlement ===
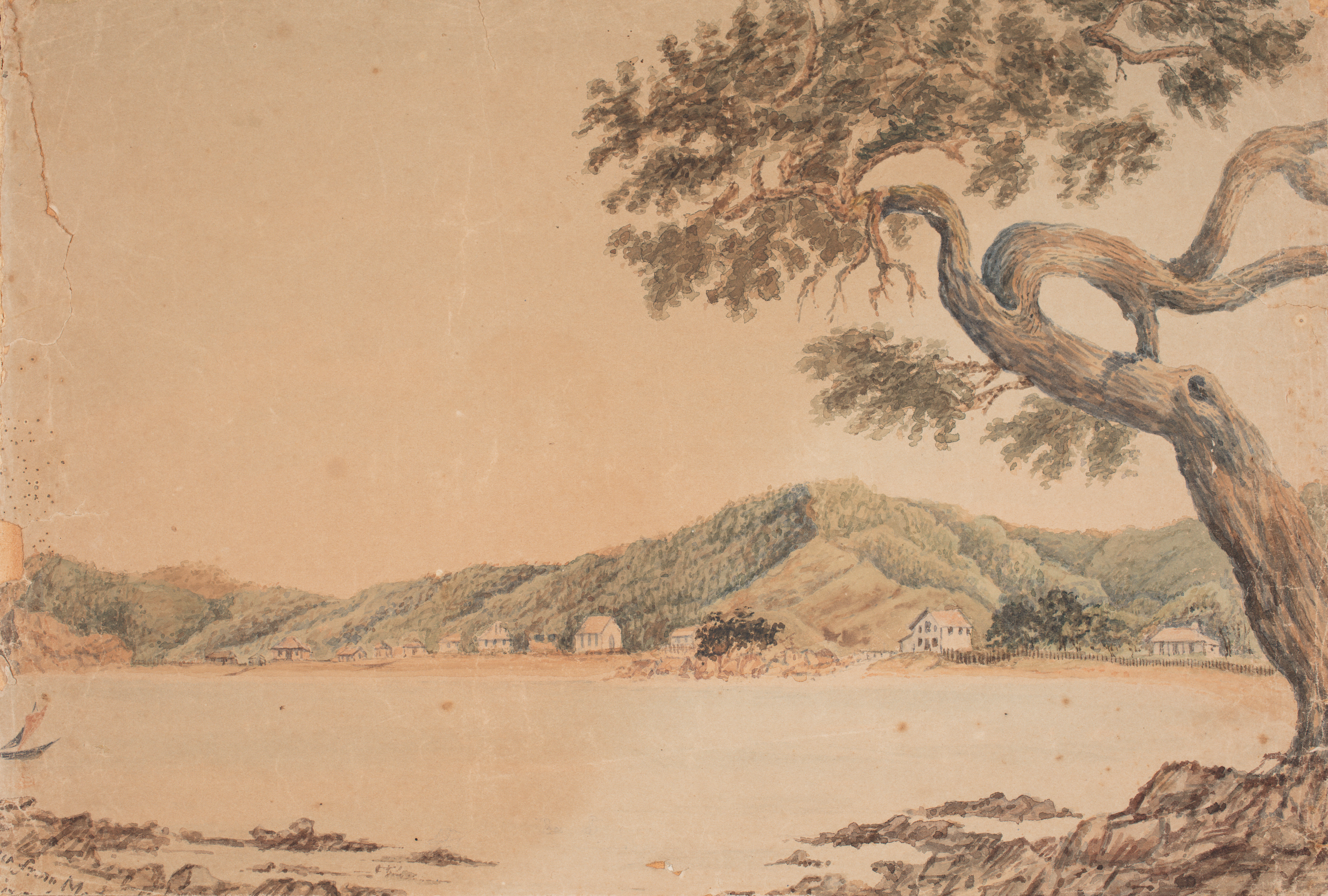
Circa 1860s watercolour of Paihia by Mrs Woods

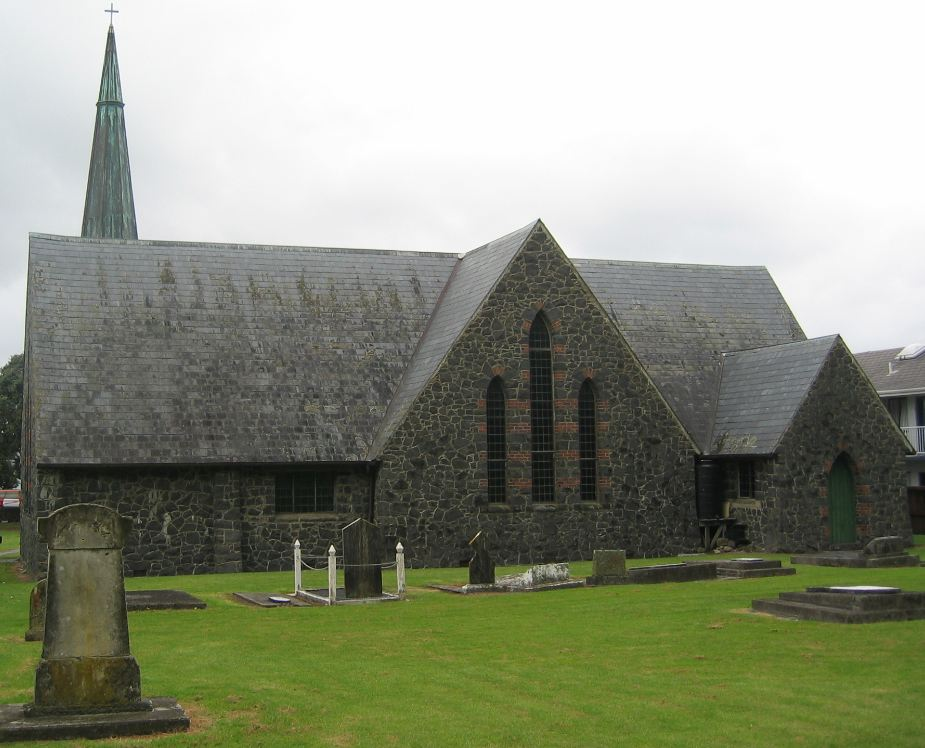
St. Paul's Anglican Church, built in 1925

CMS missionary Henry Williams and his wife Marianne settled in Paihia in 1823 and built the first church there the same year. His brother, William Williams and his wife Jane joined the Paihia mission in 1826. Bishop William Grant Broughton (the first and only Bishop of Australia) visited the Paihia mission in 1838 and performed several firsts in New Zealand including the first Confirmation and Ordination ceremonies.

The Herald was a 55-ton schooner that the missionaries built and launched off the beach at Paihia on 24 January 1826.

In December 1832 the first mention of cricket being played in New Zealand was recorded by Henry Williams. In 1835 a game of cricket was witnessed here by Charles Darwin, in December 1835 while the Beagle spent 10 days in the Bay of Islands.

In 1835 William Colenso set up the first printing press in New Zealand at Paihia.

In 1850 the mission closed and Paihia declined to a very small settlement by 1890.

=== 20th century ===
The Williams Memorial Church of St Paul is an Anglican church in Paihia. It was constructed from 1925 to 1926 and was consecrated by Archbishop Alfred Averill in 1926. It was built to commemorate the Anglican missionary Henry Williams who established a mission at Paihia and converted many local Maori. Jones and Palmer designed the bluestone church. The church is the fourth to be built on the site and the oldest grave dates back to 1826.

The triptych stained glass windows above the pulpit were commissioned by the Williams Family Trust in commemoration of Sir Nigel Reed for the 175 year family reunion and installed by the artist in 1998. The windows, titled Te Ara O Te Manawa (Pathway of the Heart), are 4 m^{2} (43 sq ft) in total size.

In 1925 a road was constructed to Puketona on the main road from Kawakawa to Kerikeri (now State Highway 10) leading to an increase in tourism in the 1930s.

== Demographics ==
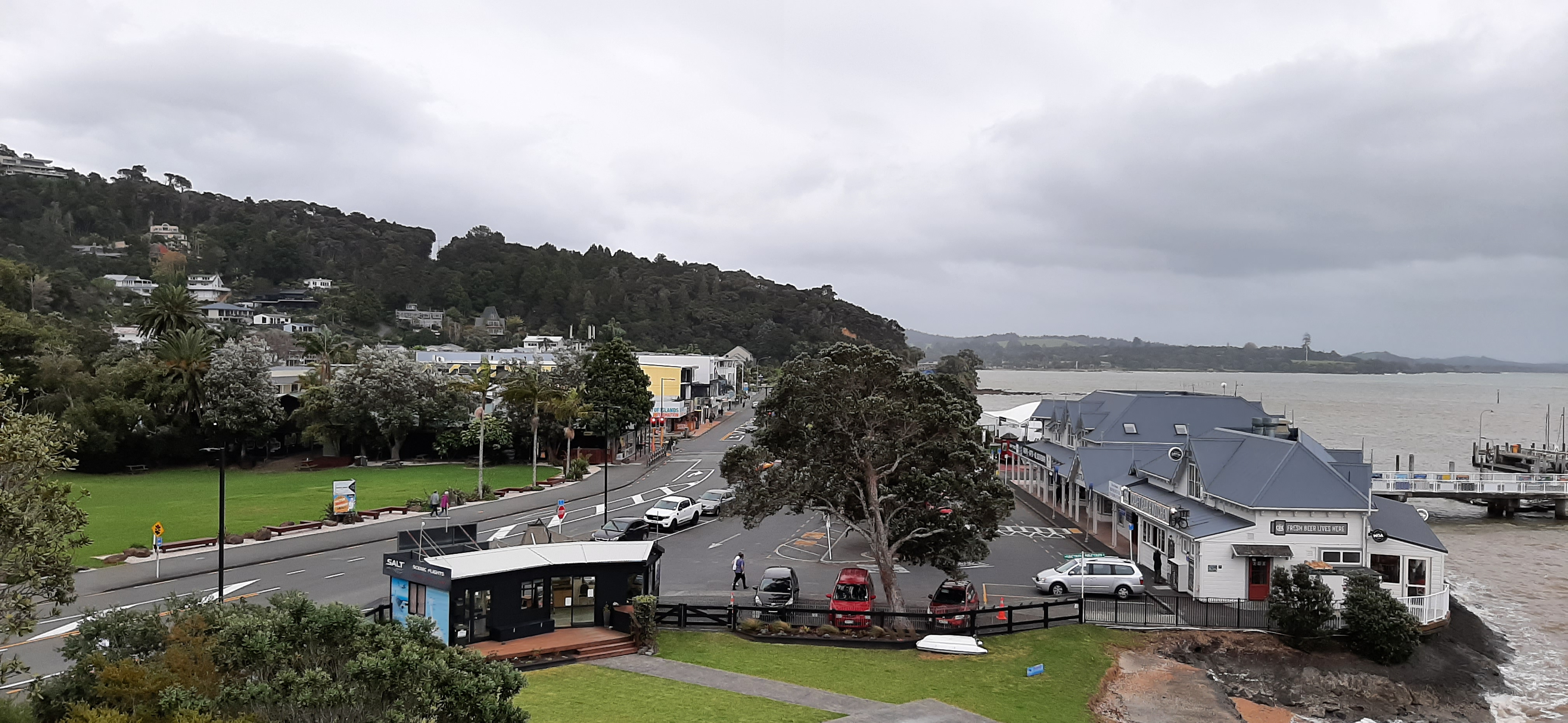
Ferry terminal and highway

Paihia covers 2.24 km^{2} (0.86 sq mi) extending from the Waitangi River in the north to the Haumi River in the south and had an estimated population of 1,640 as of June 2025, with a population density of 732 people per km^{2}.

Historical population
Year	Pop.	±% p.a.
2006	1,299	—
2013	1,290	−0.10%
2018	1,512	+3.23%
2023	1,623	+1.43%

Paihia had a population of 1,623 in the 2023 New Zealand census, an increase of 111 people (7.3%) since the 2018 census, and an increase of 333 people (25.8%) since the 2013 census. There were 825 males, 792 females and 3 people of other genders in 753 dwellings. 3.0% of people identified as LGBTIQ+. The median age was 51.0 years (compared with 38.1 years nationally). There were 189 people (11.6%) aged under 15 years, 234 (14.4%) aged 15 to 29, 738 (45.5%) aged 30 to 64, and 456 (28.1%) aged 65 or older.

People could identify as more than one ethnicity. The results were 66.7% European (Pākehā); 35.1% Māori; 6.5% Pasifika; 7.9% Asian; 1.5% Middle Eastern, Latin American and African New Zealanders (MELAA); and 1.7% other, which includes people giving their ethnicity as "New Zealander". English was spoken by 97.4%, Māori language by 11.5%, Samoan by 0.6% and other languages by 11.8%. No language could be spoken by 1.3% (e.g. too young to talk). New Zealand Sign Language was known by 0.6%. The percentage of people born overseas was 26.8, compared with 28.8% nationally.

Religious affiliations were 32.9% Christian, 0.7% Hindu, 0.6% Islam, 3.5% Māori religious beliefs, 1.3% Buddhist, 0.2% New Age, and 2.6% other religions. People who answered that they had no religion were 52.3%, and 5.7% of people did not answer the census question.

Of those at least 15 years old, 174 (12.1%) people had a bachelor's or higher degree, 744 (51.9%) had a post-high school certificate or diploma, and 450 (31.4%) people exclusively held high school qualifications. The median income was $35,100, compared with $41,500 nationally. 111 people (7.7%) earned over $100,000 compared to 12.1% nationally. The employment status of those at least 15 was that 630 (43.9%) people were employed full-time, 210 (14.6%) were part-time, and 48 (3.3%) were unemployed.

== Marae ==
Te Tii Waitangi marae and Te Tiriti o Waitangi meeting house in Te Tī Bay at the northern end of Paihia are affiliated with the Ngāpuhi hapū of Ngāti Kawa and Ngāti Rāhiri. In October 2020, the Government committed $66,234 from the Provincial Growth Fund to replacing all roofs at the marae.

== Education ==
Paihia School is a coeducational full primary (years 1–8) school with a roll of 148 students as of July 2026.

== Climate ==
Köppen-Geiger climate classification system classifies its climate as oceanic (Cfb), but it is rainier in winter. It has strong subtropical influence and is classified as such under the Trewartha system due to its consistent warm temperatures, and is the mildest weather station in New Zealand.

Climate data for Paihia (Waitangi Forest) (1991–2020)
Month	Jan	Feb	Mar	Apr	May	Jun	Jul	Aug	Sep	Oct	Nov	Dec	Year
Mean daily maximum °C (°F)	24.2 (75.6)	24.3 (75.7)	23.1 (73.6)	20.7 (69.3)	18.8 (65.8)	16.6 (61.9)	15.9 (60.6)	16.1 (61.0)	17.7 (63.9)	19.1 (66.4)	20.4 (68.7)	22.8 (73.0)	20.0 (68.0)
Daily mean °C (°F)	19.4 (66.9)	20.0 (68.0)	18.7 (65.7)	16.5 (61.7)	14.8 (58.6)	12.3 (54.1)	11.6 (52.9)	12.0 (53.6)	13.4 (56.1)	14.5 (58.1)	15.9 (60.6)	18.2 (64.8)	15.6 (60.1)
Mean daily minimum °C (°F)	14.7 (58.5)	15.8 (60.4)	14.3 (57.7)	12.3 (54.1)	10.8 (51.4)	7.9 (46.2)	7.2 (45.0)	7.8 (46.0)	9.0 (48.2)	10.0 (50.0)	11.4 (52.5)	13.6 (56.5)	11.2 (52.2)
Average rainfall mm (inches)	84.9 (3.34)	125.5 (4.94)	169.4 (6.67)	120.7 (4.75)	95.3 (3.75)	140.3 (5.52)	134.5 (5.30)	119.1 (4.69)	133.5 (5.26)	115.4 (4.54)	97.6 (3.84)	88.0 (3.46)	1,424.2 (56.06)
Mean monthly sunshine hours	229.4	176.8	163.5	148.4	145.6	112.9	142.5	142.2	161.5	206.8	174.6	199.9	2,004.1
Source: NIWA

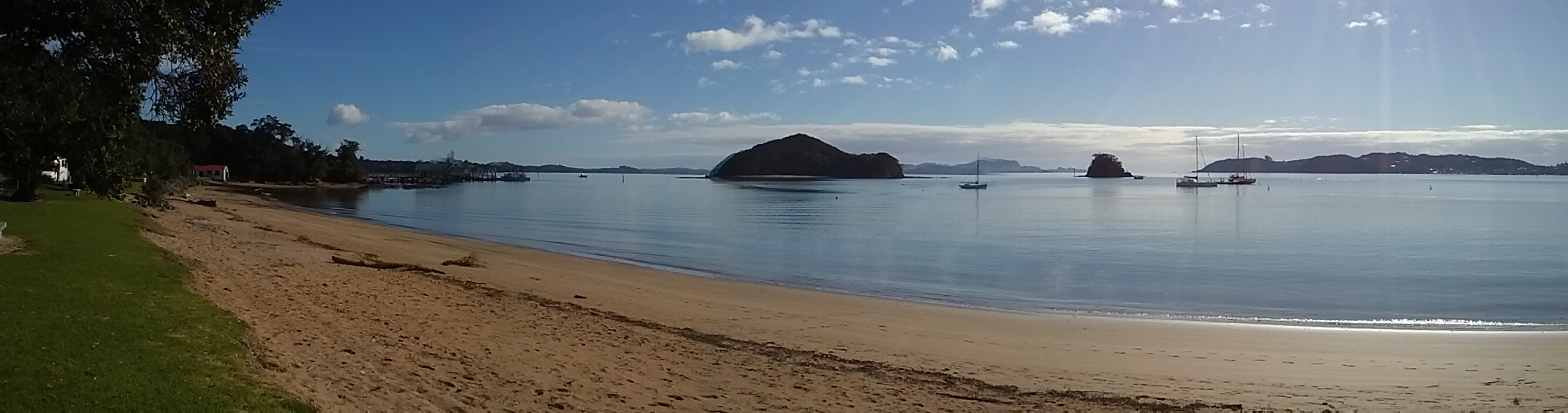
Taiputuputu Pahi Beach looking north toward Paihia wharf and Motumarie
