= Kaikohe Hill =

Hill in New Zealand

- Tokareireia
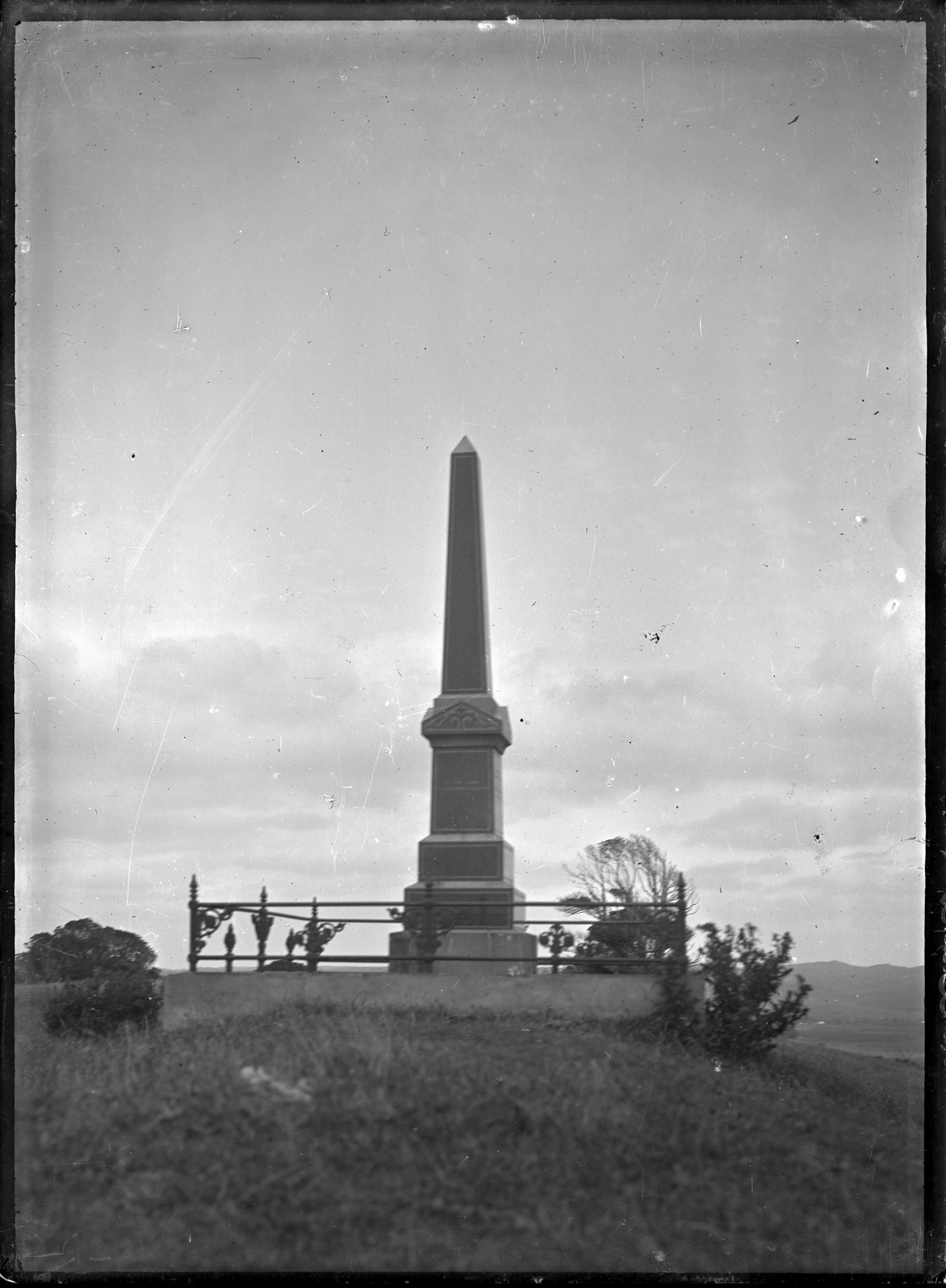
- View in 1918 of the monument in memory of Hōne Heke Ngāpua at the top of Kaikohe Hill.

Highest point
- Elevation: 282 m (925 ft)
- Coordinates: 35°24′38″S 173°47′03″E

Geography
- Location within Northland Region
- Location: Kaikohe, New Zealand

Geology
- Volcanic field: Kaikohe-Bay of Islands

Kaikohe Hill centered in map of surface volcanics with basaltic scoria and lava fields (brown) of the Kaikohe-Bay of Islands volcanic field. To its north is the violet shaded rhyolitic deposits of Putahi and red shaded andesite of Tarahi. Legend: Key for the volcanics that are shown with panning is: basalt (shades of brown/orange); monogenetic basalts; undifferentiated basalts of the Tangihua Complex in Northland Allochthon; arc basalts; arc ring basalts; dacite; andesite (shades of red); basaltic andesite; rhyolite (ignimbrite is lighter shades of violet); plutonic; White shading is selected caldera features.; Clicking on the rectangle icon enables full window and mouse-over with volcano name/wikilink and ages before present.

Kaikohe Hill (also Tokareireia, Memorial Hill) is a 282 m (925 ft) high hill in Northland, New Zealand with significance in Māori culture.

== Geography ==
It is on the western edge of the town of Kaikohe. To its north east are the extinct volcanic cones of Putahi and Tarahi and Lake Ōmāpere.

=== Geology ===
It is a basaltic scoria cone in the southern part of the Kaikohe-Bay of Islands volcanic field. The geological basement to the nearby volcanoes is likely to be the Permian-Mesozoic Waipapa Group argillite at perhaps more than 1,736 ft (529 m) deep as defined by drill hole at the nearby thermal Ngawha Springs and seismic studies.

== Culture ==
The slopes of the hill contain a memorial park to Hōne Heke Ngāpua, a great-grandnephew of Hōne Heke and leader in Māori autonomy.
