= Tauanui =

- Location within Northland Region

Highest point
- Elevation: 351 m (1,152 ft)
- Coordinates: 35°29′32″S 173°51′31″E

Geography
- Location: Kaikohe, New Zealand

Geology
- Volcanic field: Kaikohe-Bay of Islands
- Tauanui centered in map of surface volcanics with basaltic scoria and lava fields of the Kaikohe-Bay of Islands volcanic field. Legend: Key for the volcanics that are shown with panning is: basalt (shades of brown/orange); monogenetic basalts; undifferentiated basalts of the Tangihua Complex in Northland Allochthon; arc basalts; arc ring basalts; dacite; andesite (shades of red); basaltic andesite; rhyolite (ignimbrite is lighter shades of violet); plutonic; White shading is selected caldera features.; Clicking on the rectangle icon enables full window and mouse-over with volcano name/wikilink and ages before present.

Tauanui is a 351 m (1,152 ft) high basaltic scoria cone in the Kaikohe-Bay of Islands volcanic field in New Zealand and located south east of Tautoro township. It is the youngest volcano of the southern part of the field, having erupted around 60,000 years ago, and also the southernmost of the group. South east of the scoria cone is Lake Tauanui which separates it from the higher non-volcanic Tautoro hill (463 m (1,519 ft)). To the north west of Tauanui is a smaller scoria cone, Hangunui Pā. To the volcano's north are the rhyolitic Putahi and the andersitic Tarahi volcanoes.
