= Maungaturoto (volcano) =

Volcano in New Zealand

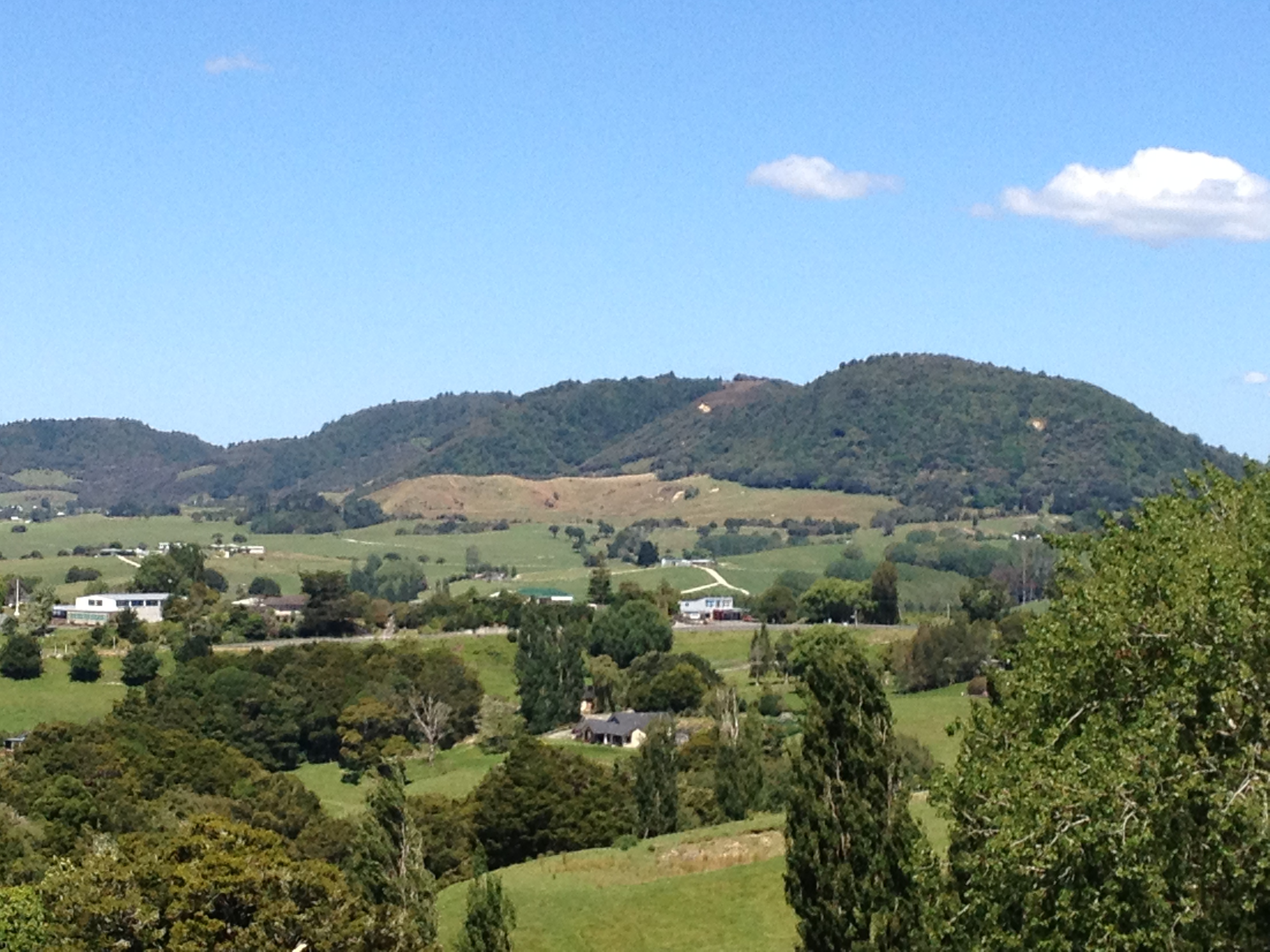
- Maungaturoto

Highest point
- Elevation: 282 m (925 ft)
- Coordinates: 35.369385°S 173.880529°E

Geography
- Maungaturoto (red marker) in map of surface volcanics with basaltic scoria and lava fields of the Kaikohe-Bay of Islands volcanic field. Te Ahuahu and Tarahi are to the east. Legend: Key for the volcanics that are shown with panning is: basalt (shades of brown/orange); monogenetic basalts; undifferentiated basalts of the Tangihua Complex in Northland Allochthon; arc basalts; arc ring basalts; dacite; andesite (shades of red); basaltic andesite; rhyolite (ignimbrite is lighter shades of violet); plutonic; White shading is selected caldera features.; Clicking on the rectangle icon enables full window and mouse-over with volcano name/wikilink and ages before present.

Geology
- Rock age: Pleistocene
- Mountain type: Basalt cone
- Rock type: Basalt
- Volcanic field: Kaikohe-Bay of Islands volcanic field

Maungaturoto is a 282 metres (925 ft) high basaltic scoria cone, in the Kaikohe-Bay of Islands volcanic field in New Zealand. It was the site of a pā.
