= Kaikohe =

Town in the Northland Region of New Zealand

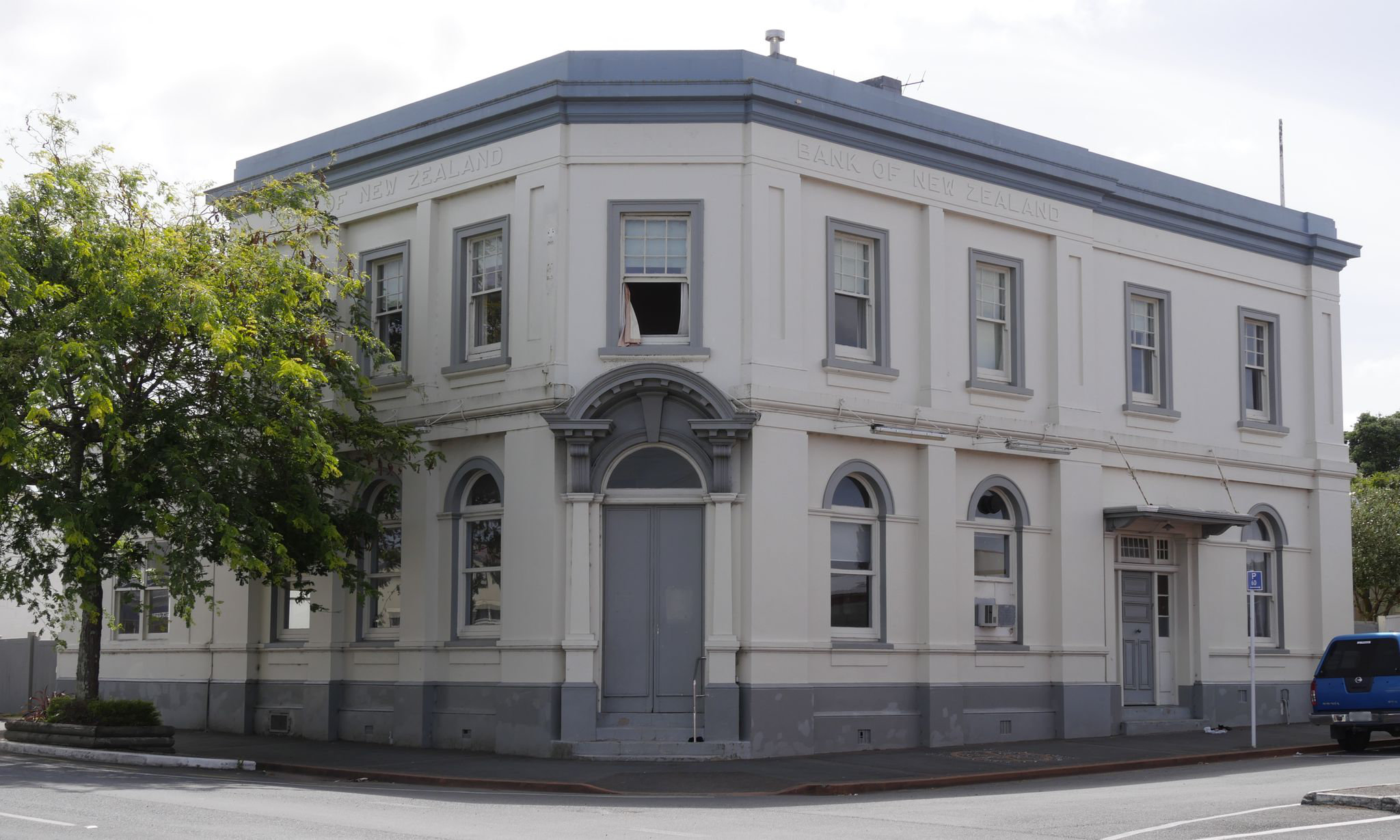
- Bank of New Zealand building
- Interactive map of Kaikohe
- Coordinates: 35°24′27″S 173°47′59″E
- Country: New Zealand
- Region: Northland Region
- District: Far North District
- Ward: Kaikohe/Hokianga
- Community: Kaikohe-Hokianga
- Subdivision: Kaikohe
- Electorates: Northland; Te Tai Tokerau

Government
  - Territorial Authority: Far North District Council
  - Regional council: Northland Regional Council
  - Mayor of the Far North: Moko Tepania
  - Northland MP: Grant McCallum
  - Te Tai Tokerau MP: TBD

Area
  - Total: 5.92 km^{2} (2.29 sq mi)

Population (June 2025)
  - Total: 4,720
  - Density: 797/km^{2} (2,060/sq mi)
- Postcode(s): 0405

Kaikohe is the seat of the Far North District of New Zealand, situated on State Highway 12 about 260 kilometres (160 mi) from Auckland, and about 85 kilometres (53 mi) from Whangārei. It is the largest inland town and highest community above sea level in the Northland Region. With a population of over 4000 people, Kaikohe is a shopping and service centre for an extensive farming district and is sometimes referred to as "the hub of the north".

== Geography ==
The town is situated on a relatively level site surrounded mainly by undulating plains and many pā sites are nearby, including Nga Huha, Pouerua, Te Rua-hoanga, Ngaungau, Kaiaia, Te Tou o Roro, Taka-poruruku, Tapa-huarau, Nga Puke-pango, Maunga-turoto, and Maunga-kawakawa. On the western edge of town, Kaikohe Hill rises 300 m above sea level, allowing views of the imposing sand dunes on the Hokianga Harbour to the west, farmlands to the east and south toward Mount Hikurangi (625 m).

To the north of the Putahi volcanic ridge is Lake Ōmāpere, five km in length, but only two to three metres deep. Around five km to the east is the small village of Ngawha Springs, where hot water springs rise to the surface from the Ngawha geothermal field, and where the Northland Region Corrections Facility is situated.

There are several volcanic scoria cones in the area, which are part of the Kaikohe-Bay of Islands volcanic field.

=== Climate ===
Climate data for Kaikohe (1991–2020 normals, extremes 1973–present)
Month	Jan	Feb	Mar	Apr	May	Jun	Jul	Aug	Sep	Oct	Nov	Dec	Year
Record high °C (°F)	34.6 (94.3)	33.0 (91.4)	33.6 (92.5)	29.1 (84.4)	23.3 (73.9)	20.4 (68.7)	19.1 (66.4)	20.5 (68.9)	23.5 (74.3)	23.2 (73.8)	28.4 (83.1)	28.4 (83.1)	34.6 (94.3)
Mean daily maximum °C (°F)	23.4 (74.1)	23.8 (74.8)	22.1 (71.8)	19.7 (67.5)	17.2 (63.0)	15.1 (59.2)	14.3 (57.7)	14.6 (58.3)	15.8 (60.4)	17.2 (63.0)	19.0 (66.2)	21.4 (70.5)	18.6 (65.5)
Daily mean °C (°F)	18.9 (66.0)	19.5 (67.1)	18.1 (64.6)	16.1 (61.0)	14.1 (57.4)	12.1 (53.8)	11.3 (52.3)	11.5 (52.7)	12.5 (54.5)	13.7 (56.7)	15.2 (59.4)	17.4 (63.3)	15.0 (59.1)
Mean daily minimum °C (°F)	14.4 (57.9)	15.2 (59.4)	14.0 (57.2)	12.6 (54.7)	11.0 (51.8)	9.1 (48.4)	8.4 (47.1)	8.4 (47.1)	9.2 (48.6)	10.1 (50.2)	11.3 (52.3)	13.4 (56.1)	11.4 (52.6)
Record low °C (°F)	8.0 (46.4)	7.4 (45.3)	6.9 (44.4)	3.8 (38.8)	1.4 (34.5)	−0.9 (30.4)	0.9 (33.6)	0.2 (32.4)	2.5 (36.5)	3.7 (38.7)	5.0 (41.0)	6.7 (44.1)	−0.9 (30.4)
Average rainfall mm (inches)	104.6 (4.12)	108.2 (4.26)	119.3 (4.70)	136.5 (5.37)	156.4 (6.16)	175.3 (6.90)	222.4 (8.76)	162.4 (6.39)	123.9 (4.88)	94.4 (3.72)	89.4 (3.52)	121.4 (4.78)	1,614.2 (63.56)
Source: NIWA

== Demographics ==
Kaikohe is described by Statistics New Zealand as a small urban area. It covers 5.92 km^{2} (2.29 sq mi) and had an estimated population of 4,720 as of June 2025, with a population density of 797 people per km^{2}.

Historical population for Kaikohe
Year	Pop.	±% p.a.
2006	4,041	—
2013	3,885	−0.56%
2018	4,455	+2.78%
2023	4,563	+0.48%
The 2006 population is for a smaller area of 5.68 km^{2} Source:

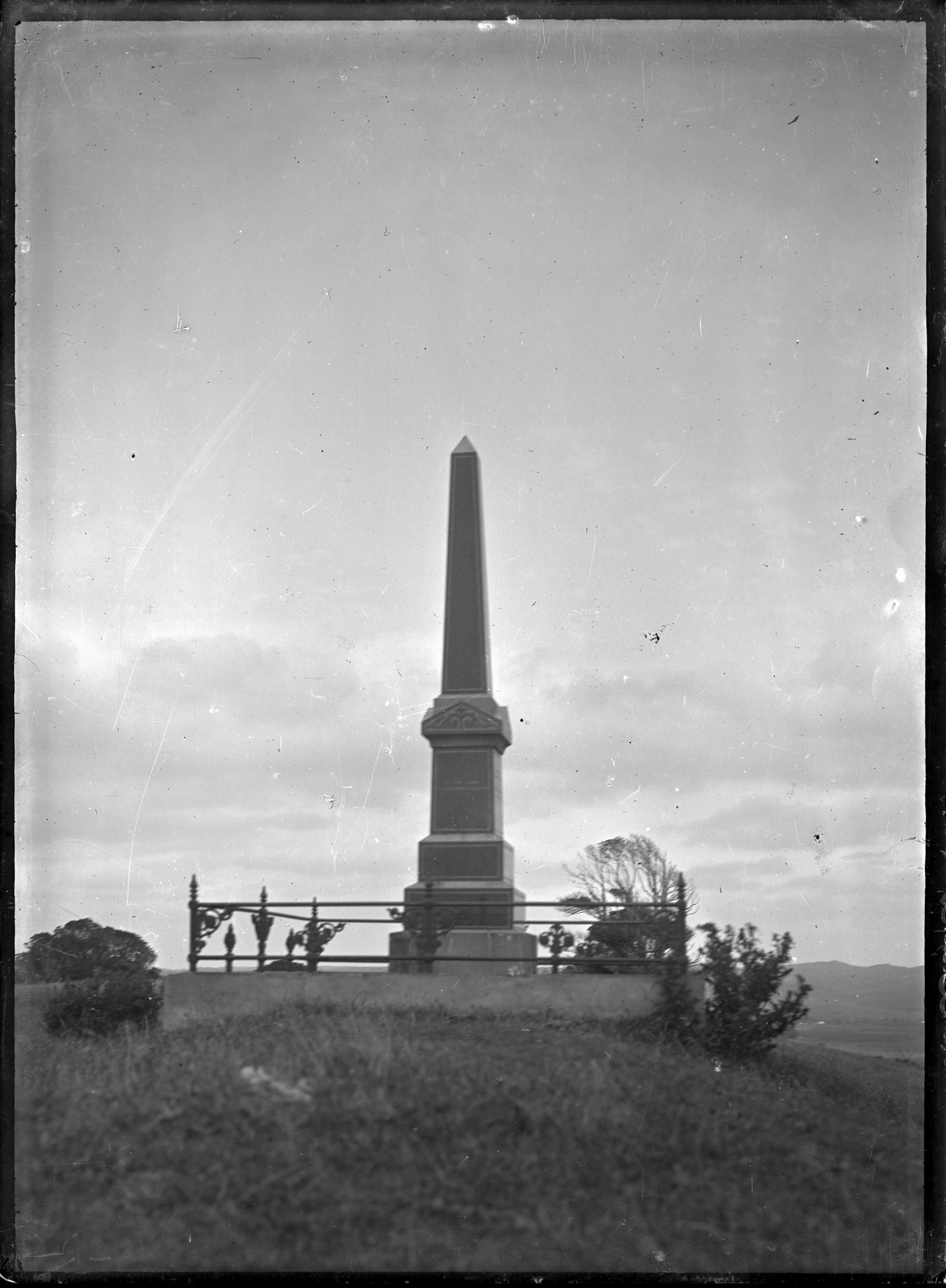
Monument to Hōne Heke at Kaikohe

Kaikohe had a population of 4,563 in the 2023 New Zealand census, an increase of 108 people (2.4%) since the 2018 census, and an increase of 678 people (17.5%) since the 2013 census. There were 2,214 males, 2,337 females and 12 people of other genders in 1,353 dwellings. 1.7% of people identified as LGBTIQ+. The median age was 31.0 years (compared with 38.1 years nationally). There were 1,263 people (27.7%) aged under 15 years, 963 (21.1%) aged 15 to 29, 1,719 (37.7%) aged 30 to 64, and 618 (13.5%) aged 65 or older.

People could identify as more than one ethnicity. The results were 35.4% European (Pākehā); 81.5% Māori; 8.3% Pasifika; 3.6% Asian; 0.3% Middle Eastern, Latin American and African New Zealanders (MELAA); and 0.8% other, which includes people giving their ethnicity as "New Zealander". English was spoken by 94.9%, Māori language by 25.2%, Samoan by 0.6% and other languages by 3.2%. No language could be spoken by 3.0% (e.g. too young to talk). New Zealand Sign Language was known by 1.4%. The percentage of people born overseas was 7.2, compared with 28.8% nationally.

Religious affiliations were 36.5% Christian, 0.6% Hindu, 0.1% Islam, 12.4% Māori religious beliefs, 0.2% Buddhist, 0.1% New Age, and 0.9% other religions. People who answered that they had no religion were 41.6%, and 8.5% of people did not answer the census question.

Of those at least 15 years old, 252 (7.6%) people had a bachelor's or higher degree, 1,914 (58.0%) had a post-high school certificate or diploma, and 1,080 (32.7%) people exclusively held high school qualifications. The median income was $28,100, compared with $41,500 nationally. 90 people (2.7%) earned over $100,000 compared to 12.1% nationally. The employment status of those at least 15 was that 1,263 (38.3%) people were employed full-time, 342 (10.4%) were part-time, and 273 (8.3%) were unemployed.

=== Ngapuhi statistical area ===
The area around Kaikohe, from the southern side of Lake Ōmāpere to Kaikohe Aerodrome and including Ngawha Springs, is the statistical area of Ngapuhi, which covers 175.14 km^{2} (67.62 sq mi) and had an estimated population of 2,000 as of June 2025, with a population density of 11 people per km^{2}.

Historical population for Ngapuhi
Year	Pop.	±% p.a.
2006	1,506	—
2013	1,347	−1.58%
2018	1,776	+5.69%
2023	1,920	+1.57%
The 2006 population is for a larger area of 175.39 km^{2} Source:

Ngapuhi had a population of 1,920 in the 2023 New Zealand census, an increase of 144 people (8.1%) since the 2018 census, and an increase of 573 people (42.5%) since the 2013 census. There were 1,152 males, 765 females and 3 people of other genders in 495 dwellings. 1.4% of people identified as LGBTIQ+. The median age was 36.9 years (compared with 38.1 years nationally). There were 360 people (18.8%) aged under 15 years, 363 (18.9%) aged 15 to 29, 951 (49.5%) aged 30 to 64, and 249 (13.0%) aged 65 or older.

People could identify as more than one ethnicity. The results were 41.4% European (Pākehā); 76.4% Māori; 7.7% Pasifika; 1.9% Asian; 0.2% Middle Eastern, Latin American and African New Zealanders (MELAA); and 1.4% other, which includes people giving their ethnicity as "New Zealander". English was spoken by 96.6%, Māori language by 26.9%, Samoan by 0.6% and other languages by 2.5%. No language could be spoken by 1.9% (e.g. too young to talk). New Zealand Sign Language was known by 0.9%. The percentage of people born overseas was 6.7, compared with 28.8% nationally.

Religious affiliations were 35.8% Christian, 0.5% Islam, 9.5% Māori religious beliefs, 0.5% Buddhist, 0.5% New Age, 0.2% Jewish, and 0.6% other religions. People who answered that they had no religion were 45.9%, and 7.5% of people did not answer the census question.

Of those at least 15 years old, 108 (6.9%) people had a bachelor's or higher degree, 915 (58.7%) had a post-high school certificate or diploma, and 507 (32.5%) people exclusively held high school qualifications. The median income was $24,500, compared with $41,500 nationally. 36 people (2.3%) earned over $100,000 compared to 12.1% nationally. The employment status of those at least 15 was that 564 (36.2%) people were employed full-time, 159 (10.2%) were part-time, and 141 (9.0%) were unemployed.

== History ==
=== Early history ===
Originally a Māori village called Ōpango, Kaikohe is recognised as being the very heart of the culture of the great Ngāpuhi iwi. In the early 19th century a rival Māori tribe raided the village and fugitives subsisted among the kohekohe (a native tree) groves on Tokareireia (Kaikohe Hill). After the incident, the village became known as Kaikohekohe (kai meaning food) but was later shortened to Kaikohe.

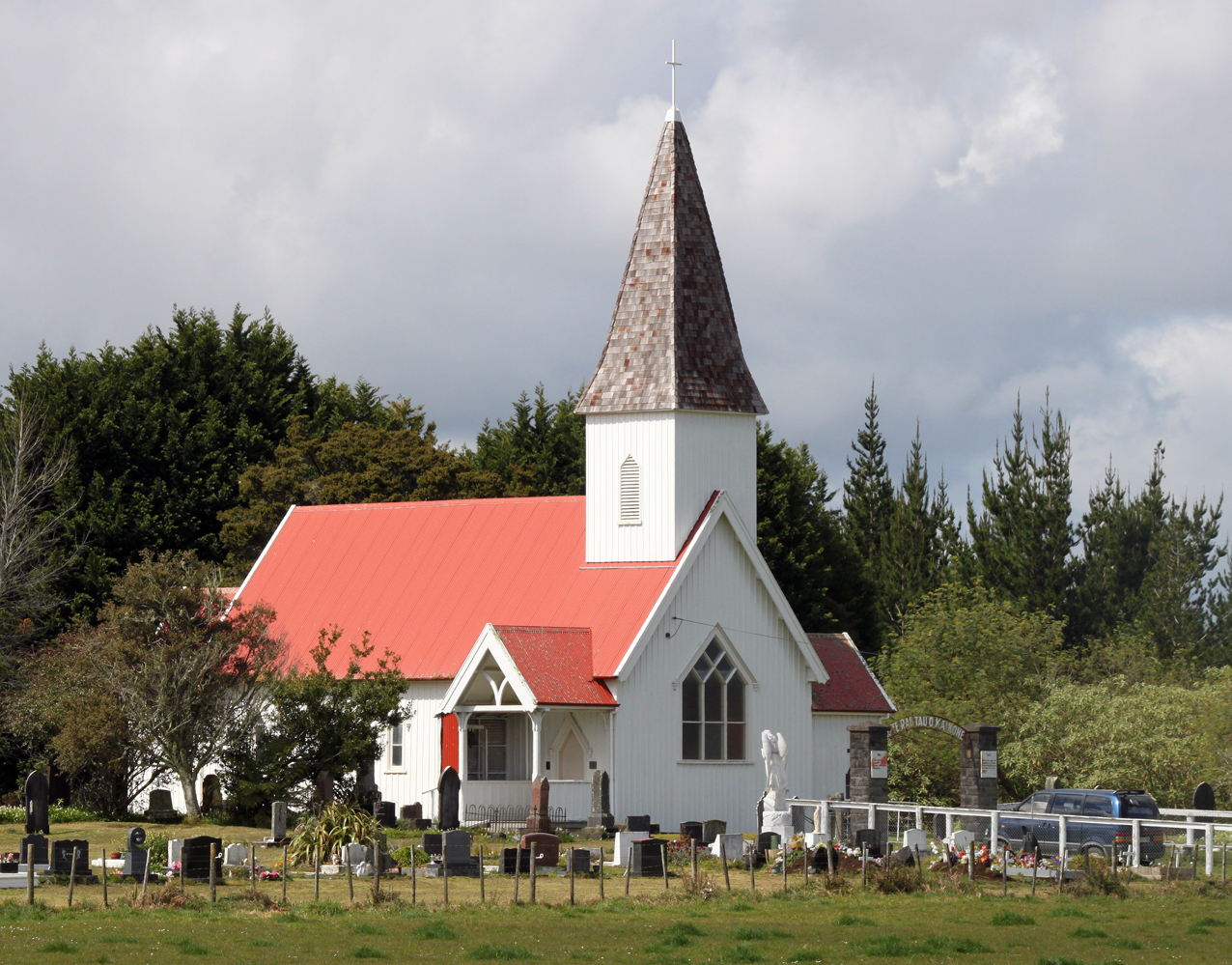
Aperahama Church, named after Aperahama Te Awa, who is buried in the churchyard

Battles during the Flagstaff War (also known as Hōne Heke's Rebellion) were fought around Kaikohe: at Hōne Heke's pā at Puketutu on the shores of Lake Ōmāpere; followed by a battle at Te Ahuahu; with the warriors of Te Ruki Kawiti fighting the Battle of Ōhaeawai. The warrior chief Hōne Heke settled in Kaikohe after fighting ceased, and died there in 1850.His grand-nephew Hone Heke Ngapua, MP for Northern Maori, also lived in Kaikohe. In April 1911, a monument to him was unveiled on Kaikohe Hill by Sir James Carroll, acting Prime Minister. A park in the town is dedicated to Rawiri Taiwhanga who has a very strong claim to being New Zealand's first commercial dairy farmer. He milked a herd of cows and sold butter in 1834.

To the west of the town is the Aperahama Anglican Church, named after Aperahama Te Awa. It was opened in 1885, a year after his death, and he is buried in the churchyard. It is on the site of an earlier church, built in 1837, and the existing memorial gates were erected and dedicated for that earlier church. The building is registered as a place "of special or outstanding historical or cultural heritage significance or value" by Heritage New Zealand.

Kaikohe was an important location for the late 19th/early 20th century kauri gum digging trade.

=== Transport ===
Kaikohe was linked to the national rail network with the arrival of a branch line railway being built from Otiria on the North Auckland Line to Kaitaia, which opened to Kaikohe on 1 May 1914. The line continued north to Ōkaihau, opening on 29 October 1923 and eventually reached Rangiahua, although the section between Okaihau and Rangiahua was never handed over to the New Zealand Railways Department for operation and the line never reached Kaitaia. The line between Okaihau and Rangiahua was operated for a short time by the Public Works Department before being closed and dismantled during World War II. The railway through Kaikohe thus became known as the Okaihau Branch.

Although Kaikohe became the service centre of the Far North, it failed to generate much rail traffic in the early years of the line. During the first ten months of existence, just 1,500 tons of inbound freight was carried, with roughly half that carried outbound, and the decline continued to the point where in 1918 Kaikohe lost its stationmaster. Minimal services were offered, and although losses increased up to 1930, fortunes had somewhat improved by 1940, and by 1950 there was sufficient traffic to justify six trains each way a week. Two carried only freight, while four were mixed goods/passenger trains. At that time, a full complement of staff was again employed at Kaikohe.

When railcars were introduced on services north of Auckland in November 1956, they ran through Kaikohe all the way to Okaihau. Previously, a carriage train known as the Northland Express had run from Auckland to Opua with connections to Kaikohe and Okaihau via the mixed trains, but with the change of the northern terminus to Okaihau, the branch increased in importance. This proved to be short-lived; in July 1967 the popular railcar service was withdrawn due to mechanical problems plaguing the railcars. Passengers had to use the mixed trains, with significantly older rolling stock on a slower schedule. Demand decreased and the branch closed to passengers on 21 June 1976.

In 1977, a relaxation of road transport laws led to a decline in freight traffic on the line and forestry proposals that would have required a railway service failed to eventuate. Scheduled trains were cancelled beyond Kaikohe on 12 August 1983, and for a little over four years the line was shunted when required. The branch closed on 1 November 1987 and the track has been lifted. The rail corridor through Kaikohe is still owned by the New Zealand Railways Corporation, being retained in case any forestry proposals come to fruition and the railway is again required, although it now forms part of the Twin Coast Cycle Trail.

Kaikohe Aerodrome was built in 1942 as a US Marines bomber base. It had scheduled air services from 1947 to 1983. It is now used for general aviation and is owned by the Far North District Council.

== Culture and attractions ==
Kaikohe is the geographical centre of the Far North. It is the home of the Kaikohe Demolition Derby, which featured in the Kaikohe Demolition movie filmed by Florian Habicht. There is a pioneer village, a 19th-century Northland community recreated with all its atmosphere, history and detail. The Twin Coast Cycle Trail, part of the New Zealand Cycle Trail project, runs through the town.

The Kaikohe area has one Ngāpuhi marae:

- Te Kiore Marae and Te Kiore meeting house are affiliated with Ngāti Whakaminenga.

== Local government ==
From 1876, Kaikohe was administered as part of Bay of Islands County. The town attained borough status on 1 July 1947, separating from Bay of Islands County, after a poll of Kaikohe electors saw a vote for the establishment of the borough of 207 votes in favour and 27 against. The first mayor and members of the Kaikohe Borough Council were elected on 20 August 1947. In the 1989 local government reforms, Kaikohe Borough re-amalgamated with Bay of Islands County and joined with Mangonui County, Hokianga County, Whangaroa County and Kaitaia Borough to create the Far North District. Kaikohe was selected to be the seat of the new district and the council's main headquarters are located in the township.

=== Mayors of Kaikohe ===
During the period of the Kaikohe Borough Council from 1947 to 1989, Kaikohe had at least five mayors. The following is an incomplete list:

	Name	Term of office	Notes
1	Harold Fisher Guy	1947–1959	
2	Pearce Melvin Eddy Williams	1959–1971	
3	Wally Lomax	1971–1977	
4	Nītama Paewai	1977–1980	

== Education ==
Northland College is a secondary (years 9–15) school with a roll of 309. It was founded in 1947 on the site of a former United States Army camp. The school incorporates a working farm and forestry block. A $14 million reconstruction of the school was completed in 2016–17.

Kaikohe Intermediate School (years 7–8) has a roll of 119. It was established in 1969, taking over the grounds of the former Kaikohe Primary School.

Kaikohe East School and Kaikohe West School are contributing primary (years 1–6) schools with rolls of 244 and 182 respectively. Kaikohe West School opened in 1882 as Kaikohe Native School. The name changed to Kaikohe Maori School in the mid-1950s, and to the current name in 1969. Kaikohe East School has a Māori unit offering bilingual and total immersion classes.

Te Kura Kaupapa Māori o Kaikohe is a composite (years 1–15) school with a roll of 243. It is a Kura Kaupapa Māori school which teaches fully in the Māori language through to Year 13. The school originated in the early 1990s and opened on its present site about 2003.

Kaikohe Christian School is a state-integrated composite school (years 1–13) with a roll of 154 The school has a Kaikohe campus and a smaller Kerikeri campus which opened in 1985 and 2004, respectively.

All these schools are coeducational. School rolls are as of July 2026.

NorthTec polytechnic has a campus in Kaikohe.

== Notable residents ==
Former New Zealand Prime Minister David Lange lived in Kaikohe for a time. Former New Zealand First Member of Parliament and brother of Winston Peters, Jim Peters, was a resident. Christian Huriwai, winner of the street unicycling competition at the 2010 World Championships in Wellington, is a current resident. The New Zealand Kiwis rugby league player Olsen Filipaina was born in the town. Two professional boxers have lived in Kaikohe – Daniella Smith and Patricia Vaka.
