= Hurupaki Mountain =

Volcanic field in New Zealand

- Map of surface volcanics centred on the Hurupaki Mountain in the Whangārei volcanic field. The brown basalt field takes in the basalt volcanics of Hurupaki, Rawhitiroa and Ngararatunua. The purple shaded area immediately to the north is the dacite volcanics of Parakiore. Clicking on the map enlarges it, and enables panning and mouseover of nearby volcanic feature name/wikilink and ages before present. The key to the other volcanics that are shown with panning is basalt - brown, monogenic basalts - dark brown, undifferentiated basalts of the Tangihua Complex in Northland Allochthon - light brown, arc basalts - deep orange brown, arc ring basalts -orange brown, dacite = purple, andesite - red, basaltic andesite - orange-red, rhyolite - violet, ignimbrite (lighter shades of violet), and plutonic - gray.

Highest point
- Elevation: 349 m (1,145 ft)
- Coordinates: 35.68293°S 174.28182°E

Geology
- Mountain type: Volcano
- Rock type(s): Basalt, intra-plate monogenetic
- Volcanic field: Whangārei volcanic field

Hurupaki Mountain is in Kamo, Whangārei, New Zealand. The centre of Hurupaki Mountain lies between Three Mile Bush Road and Dip Road, approximately 1.5 kilometres west of Kamo township. Hurupaki Mountain is visible from State Highway 1.

== Characteristics ==
Hurupaki Mountain is a high scoria cone whose associated basalt lava has been dated at 310,000 years old. It is part of the Puhipuhi-Whangarei volcanic field. This volcanic area is similar to the Auckland volcanic field in that it has formed over a type of hot spot in the mantle, i.e. not at a current plate boundary.

The Whangārei field is older than the Auckland field, and Hurupaki is probably one of the younger centres. There is another basaltic field in Northland, the Kaikohe-Bay of Islands volcanic field, which also has some young scoria cones and lava flows. Both of these Northland fields are older than the Auckland field.

Hurupaki Mountain is a steep sided, partly bush-covered scoria cone. It is 1–2 km in diameter and 349 metres (1,145 ft) high, and has been extensively quarried on the west side. One quarry exposes an eruption sequence showing that magma variation occurred during eruption. The east side shows an excellent example of a young scoria cone. A multivented cone forms a smaller knoll approximately 400 metres (1,300 ft) to the east, less than 150 metres higher than surrounding land, on which a few houses stand adjacent to the Onoke Scenic Reserve. This is the easternmost cone of a group of three centres: (east to west) Hurupaki, Rawhitiroa (height 292 m (958 ft)) and Ngararatunua (height 326 m (1,070 ft)).

== Pre-European history ==
Hurupaki is a Māori word and means to cover with a cloak. Hurupaki Mountain was once a large Māori pa with a considerable number of pits and terraces. When occupied, the pa would have been clear of trees. The slopes of the hill were terraced to provide flat areas on which to build houses, construct storage pits and as general living areas.

The pa has about 70 pits on it; most of these were probably used as underground storage for kumara and berries, grown on the slopes of the hill. Some of the shallow pits and terraces would have had whares built on them.

The Maori chief, Pohe, had his pa on the mountain, and was chief of most of the area within the Whangarei district, as so claimed by his descendants. He was the right-hand man of Hone Heke, and was trusted by Heke to fulfil his role as guardian of the Whangarei Harbour and Kamo West area, known as Nga-rara-i-tunua.

== Present day ==
Today Hurupaki Mountain is partly farmed (cows and sheep). There is also a small pine tree plantation and the rest is in native bush. There is public access to the top of the mountain, although there is no viewing platform at the top.
