= Putahi =

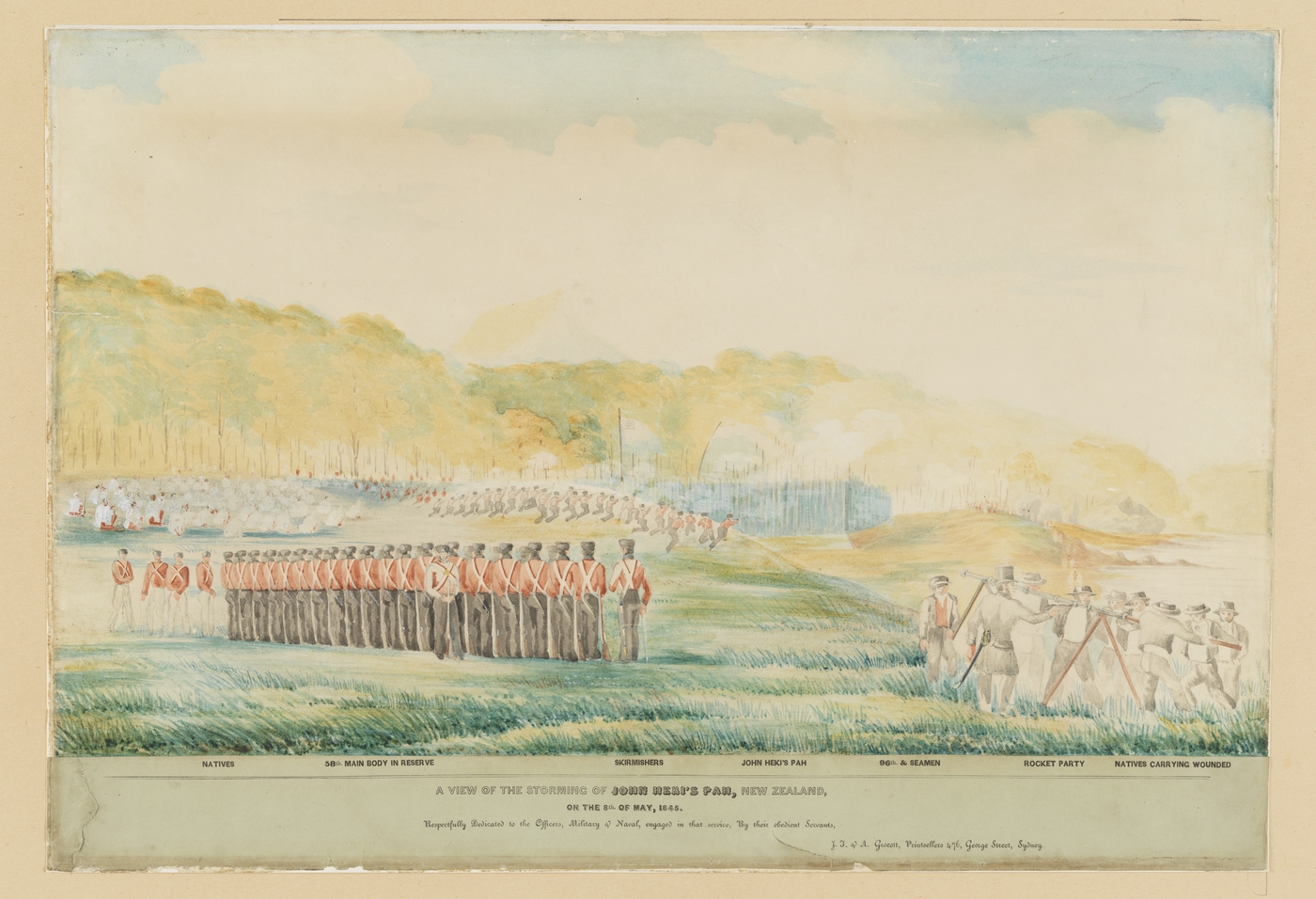
- The storming of Hōne Heke's pā at Putahi, on the 8th of May 1845. Watercolour is by an unknown artist and held in the State Library of New South Wales.

Highest point
- Elevation: 381 m (1,250 ft)
- Coordinates: 35.373462°S 173.808796°E

Geography
- Putahi (red marker) and its rhyolite (violet), with nearby lava fields of the Kaikohe-Bay of Islands volcanic field. Legend: Key for the volcanics that are shown with panning is: basalt (shades of brown/orange); monogenetic basalts; undifferentiated basalts of the Tangihua Complex in Northland Allochthon; arc basalts; arc ring basalts; dacite; andesite (shades of red); basaltic andesite; rhyolite (ignimbrite is lighter shades of violet); plutonic; White shading is selected caldera features.; Clicking on the rectangle icon enables full window and mouse-over with volcano name/wikilink and ages before present.

Geology
- Rock age: Pleistocene
- Mountain type: Rhyolite cone
- Rock type: Rhyolite

Putahi is a 381 m (1,250 ft) high rhyolite dome, in the Kaikohe-Bay of Islands volcanic field in New Zealand. To the north of Putahi is Lake Ōmāpere. To its north east are the volcanoes of Tarahi and Te Ahuahu.

== History ==
It was the site of the first, successful for the British, battle of the Flagstaff War of 1845–46 against Hōne Heke's Ngāpuhi tribe fraction. Lieutenant-Colonel William Hulme and his force of about 200 soldiers, marines and volunteers having destroyed a coastal pā at Ōtuihu moved on Hōne Heke at his new pā (Te Mawhe Pā) on the Lake Ōmāpere side of Puketutu which they arrived at on 7 May 1845 before its fortifications were fully complete. However the next day, they were attacked on the flank by a force of 140 fighters led by Te Ruki Kawiti and as the British dealt with this, Hōne Heke attacked from the pā defences. In the fierce running battle that ensured the Ngāpuhi withdrew initially to the pā, and then abandoning it, after the British realised they could not take it without artillery, so withdrew themselves from continued confrontation. The Ngāpuhi had lost 28 warriors to the British death toll of 15 by the time of the British occupation of the now empty pā, that never again was used by the Ngāpuhi. The Māori learnt an important lesson at Puketutu: that the British were a formidable foe in open battle and changed their tactics towards using fully prepared pās in future clashes.
