= Whangārei volcanic field =

Volcanic field in New Zealand

- Puhipuhi-Whangarei volcanic field
- Map of surface volcanics centred on the Whangārei volcanic field. Legend: Key for the volcanics that are shown with panning is: basalt (shades of brown/orange); monogenetic basalts; undifferentiated basalts of the Tangihua Complex in Northland Allochthon; arc basalts; arc ring basalts; dacite; andesite (shades of red); basaltic andesite; rhyolite (ignimbrite is lighter shades of violet); plutonic; White shading is selected caldera features.; Clicking on the rectangle icon enables full window and mouse-over with volcano name/wikilink and ages before present.

Highest point
- Coordinates: 35.66°S 174.28°E

Geology
- Rock age: late Pliocene to Quaternary 22.6–0.31 Ma
- Mountain type: Volcanic field
- Rock type(s): basaltic and dacicitic intra-plate monogenetic
- Last eruption: 260 ka

The Whangārei volcanic field (Puhipuhi-Whangarei volcanic field) is an area of intra-plate monogenetic volcanism located near the city of Whangārei, North Island, New Zealand. It was last active between 260,000 to 319,000 years ago and continues to be potentially active as a low-velocity seismic zone in the crust exists beneath Whangārei, which is interpreted to be a body of partial melt. This mantle source has been coupled to the lithosphere for about 8 million years. As the field has potentially been active at low frequency for millions of years, with 100,000 years or more between events it might best be regarded as dormant. The recent vents active in the last million years include some dacite in composition. Composition details are freely available for most of the field but many vents do not have ages.

== Geology ==
=== Volcanics ===
These volcanoes are part of the eastern Northland volcanic belt which includes the monogenetic Kaikohe-Bay of Islands volcanic field and the volcanoes of the Whangārei Heads and the Hen of the Hen and Chickens Islands which are not part of the field. Rather the volcanoes of the Whangārei Heads are usually related to the now extinct predominantly andesitic Taurikura volcanic complex and its caldera, although the close proximity, overlap in time, and dacite eruptive centres possibly reflects a continuum.

=== Non-volcanics and tectonics ===
The hilly landscape to the west of Whangārei is from uplifted Waipapa Terrane greywacke deposits from ocean floor sediments first laid down several hundred millions ago off the coast of Gondwanaland. There are some coal measures, sandstone, and limestone from late Eocene and Oligocene (Te Kuiti Group) sediments laid on top of the greywacke basement. On top of these contributing to many hills are often more clay like deposits originally from the floor of the Pacific Ocean of 80-25 million years ago. About 25 million years ago these deep-sea sediments were uplifted as the Northland Allochthon. There are no known active faults in Northland Historic faults are believed, due to volcanic alignment, to have been permissive to the surface volcanism of the last 25 million years, with the Whangārei Harbour fault being a prominent example.

== List of volcanoes ==
Name	Age (thousand years)	Height	Location (Coordinates)	Geology	Images
Hikurangi	1.2 ± 0.1 Ma	179 m (587 ft)	35.04170°S 173.45992°E	Dacite	
Whakapara Hill		218 m (715 ft)	35.556895°S 174.270204°E	Basalt	
Apotu	4.2 ± 1.1 Ma	218 m (715 ft)	35.640402°S 174.290493°E	Basalt	
Parakiore	0.8 ± 0.1 Ma	391 m (1,283 ft)	35.65881°S 174.28141°E	Dacite	
Hurupaki (adjacent peaks to the west long named unofficially by local Māori Rawhitiroa and Ngararatunua)	0.31 Ma	349 m (1,145 ft)	35.68293°S 174.28182°E	Basalt	
Mount Parihaka (previously also known as Mount Parahaki, but the original Māori spelling of Parihaka was confirmed in 2005.)	22.6 - 19.57 Ma	259 m (850 ft)	35.71252°S 174.33653°E	Dacite,	View from Mount Parihaka towards south west. Maungatapere is the volcanic cone in the distant right
Maungakaramea		225 m (738 ft)	35.844197°S 174.191321°E	Basalt	
Maungatapere	0.5 - 0.32 Ma	359 m (1,178 ft)	35.777700°S 174.191367°E	Basalt	
Onerahi	4 Ma	41 m (135 ft) plus	35.749424°S 174.362867°E	Basalt	Onerahi Peninsula lava flow
