= Pouērua =

Scoria cone in the Kaikohe-Bay of Islands volcanic field, New Zealand

- Pouērua (red marker) in map of surface volcanics with scoria and lava fields of the Kaikohe-Bay of Islands volcanic field. Tarahi is to the east. Legend: Key for the volcanics that are shown with panning is: basalt (shades of brown/orange); monogenetic basalts; undifferentiated basalts of the Tangihua Complex in Northland Allochthon; arc basalts; arc ring basalts; dacite; andesite (shades of red); basaltic andesite; rhyolite (ignimbrite is lighter shades of violet); plutonic; White shading is selected caldera features.; Clicking on the rectangle icon enables full window and mouse-over with volcano name/wikilink and ages before present.

Highest point
- Elevation: 270 m (890 ft)
- Coordinates: 35.370011°S 173.932688°E

Geology
- Rock age: Pleistocene
- Mountain type: Basalt cone
- Rock type: Basalt
- Volcanic field: Kaikohe-Bay of Islands volcanic field

Pouērua (also Pou e rua), is a 270 m (890 ft) high basaltic scoria cone, in the Kaikohe-Bay of Islands volcanic field in New Zealand. It is in the locality of Pakaraka and was the site of a pā that was studied during a major archeological project in the 1980s. Pouērua is registered with the Historic Places Trust as a traditional site (Registration Number 6711).

== Culture ==
The last Māori who occupied Pouērua were the Ngāti Rāhiri subtribe of Ngāpuhi. They left in about 1860.

According to the Historic Places Trust, Pouērua is considered the origin and the watershed or pou of the two tribal areas of Ngāpuhi, at the Hokianga in the west and Taumarere in the east.
