= Tarahi (volcano) =

Volcano in New Zealand

- Tarahi andesite (red shading), and nearly basaltic scoria and lava fields (brown) of the Kaikohe-Bay of Islands volcanic field in centre of map. To its immediate south east is Putahi rhyolite (violet) and to its north Te Ahuahu andesite (red) separated by the basalt (brown) of Haruru pā. Legend: Key for the volcanics that are shown with panning is: basalt (shades of brown/orange); monogenetic basalts; undifferentiated basalts of the Tangihua Complex in Northland Allochthon; arc basalts; arc ring basalts; dacite; andesite (shades of red); basaltic andesite; rhyolite (ignimbrite is lighter shades of violet); plutonic; White shading is selected caldera features.; Clicking on the rectangle icon enables full window and mouse-over with volcano name/wikilink and ages before present.

Highest point
- Elevation: 388 m (1,273 ft)
- Coordinates: 35.361905°S 173.850414°E

Geology
- Rock age: Pleistocene
- Rock type: Andesite

Tarahi is a 388 m (1,273 ft) high andesite volcano, in the Kaikohe-Bay of Islands volcanic field in New Zealand that was never a pā. Northwest of Tarahi is a smaller, 350 m (1,150 ft) basaltic scoria cone, Haruru pā, before the higher cone of Te Ahuahu. To its immediate east is Putahi and the location of a famous battle of the Flagstaff War adjacent to Lake Ōmāpere.

Although mostly covered in pasture, it has some native forest on its slopes and a telecommunications facility.

== Geology ==
It is a breached scoria cone about 140 m (460 ft) above its Tarahi andesite lava flows which cover about 14.5 km^{2} (5.6 sq mi). This flow in turn is covered in part by younger features to the south of the Waimimiti scoria mounds and the lava flows from the Maungaturoto volcanic cone to the east.
