= Te Ruki Kawiti =

19th-century Māori rangatira (chief)

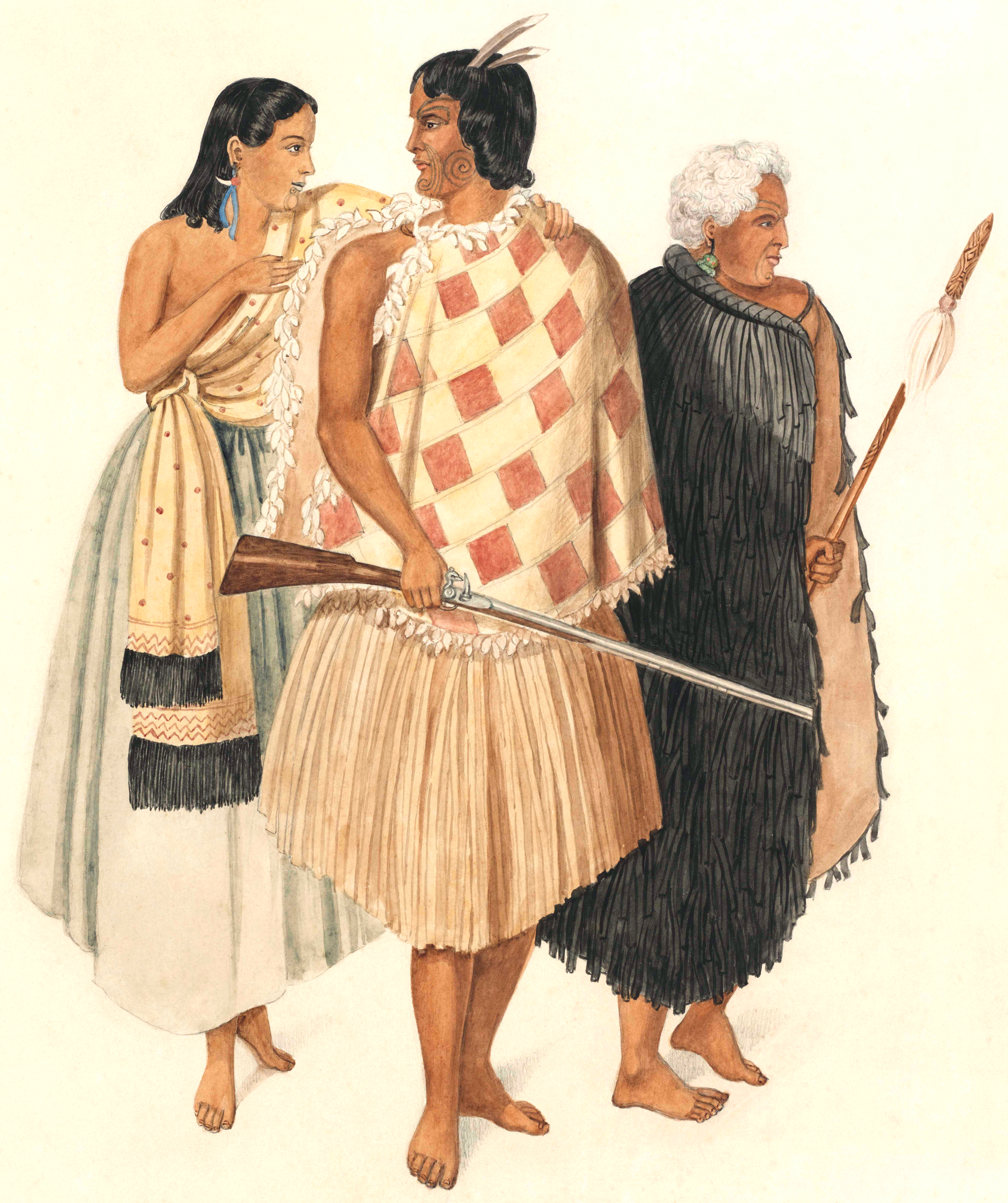
Te Ruki Kawiti far right, with his nephew Hōne Heke and Heke's wife Hariata

Te Ruki Kawiti (1770s – 5 May 1854) was a prominent Māori rangatira (chief). He and Hōne Heke successfully fought the British in the Flagstaff War in 1845–46.

He traced descent from Rāhiri and Nukutawhiti of the Ngātokimatawhaorua canoe, the ancestors of the Ngāpuhi. He was born in the north of New Zealand into the Ngāti Hine hapū, one of the subtribes of the Ngāpuhi. From his youth he was trained in leadership and warfare by Hongi Hika. He was present at the Battle of Moremonui in 1807 or 1808 when many Ngāpuhi were slaughtered by Ngāti Whātua, despite the former having a few muskets. Almost twenty years later, in 1825, he was at the Battle of Te Ika-a-ranga-nui when it was Ngāpuhi's turn to slaughter Ngāti Whātua in an act of utu, or revenge. He took a number of Ngāti Whātua captive and refused to hand them over to Hongi Hika, preferring instead to return them to their own people to whom he was related.

== Treaty of Waitangi ==
Kawiti initially refused to sign the Treaty of Waitangi on 6 February 1840, believing that it would inevitably lead to further European encroachment and the loss of Māori land. However he eventually yielded to pressure from his own people and signed the treaty in May 1840, right at the top of the Waitangi sheet, above those chiefs who had signed earlier.

However he soon grew disenchanted with British law and supported Hōne Heke in his protests against British rule. Hōne Heke sought support from Kawiti and other leaders of the Ngāpuhi iwi by the conveying of ‘te ngākau’, the custom observed by those who sought help to settle a tribal grievance.

Kawiti also signed He Whakaputanga.

== Battle of Kororāreka ==
Heke and Te Ruki Kawiti worked out the plan to draw the Colonial forces into battle, with the opening provocations focusing on the flagstaff on Maiki Hill at the north end Kororāreka. When in March 1845 Heke cut down the flag pole at Kororāreka for the fourth time, thereby initiating the Flagstaff War, Kawiti, now in his seventies, created a diversion by attacking the town.

The Māori warriors followed their chief and would fight in separate groups; however Kawiti and Heke coordinated their tactics at each battle. The conduct of the Flagstaff War appears to follow a strategy of drawing the Colonial forces into attacking a fortified pā, from which the warriors could fight from a strong defensive position that was secure from cannon fire. Kawiti was the senior rangatira and appears to have had a key role in the strategic decisions as to the design of the strengthened defences of Pene Taui's pā at Ōhaeawai and the design and construction of the new pā that was built at Ruapekapeka to engage the British forces.

== Battle of the sticks ==
After the Battle of Kororāreka, Heke and Kawiti and the warriors travelled inland to Lake Ōmāpere near to Kaikohe some 20 miles (32 km), or two days travel, from the Bay of Islands. Tamati Waka Nene built a pā close to Lake Ōmāpere. Heke's pā, named Puketutu, was 2 miles (3.2 km) away, while it is sometimes named as "Te Mawhe", however the hill of that name is some distance to the north-east. In April 1845, during the time that the colonial forces were gathering in the Bay of Islands, the warriors of Heke and Nene fought many skirmishes on the small hill named Taumata-Karamu, which was between the two pās and on open country between Ōkaihau and Te Ahuahu. Heke's force numbered about 300 men; Kawiti joined Heke towards the end of April with another 150 warriors. Among Kawiti's supporters was his nephew Reweti Maika. Opposing Heke and Kawiti were about 400 warriors that supported Tamati Waka Nene, including the chiefs Makoare Te Taonui and his son Aperahama Taonui, Mohi Tawhai, Arama Karaka Pi, and Nōpera Panakareao.

== Attack on Heke's Pā at Puketutu ==
The first major engagement of the Flagstaff War was the attack on Heke's Pā at Puketutu in May 1845 by the colonial forces led by Lt Col William Hulme. While Heke occupied the pā itself, Kawiti and his warriors arrived at the battle and engaged the Colonial forces in the scrub and gullies around the pā. They successfully prevented the Colonial forces from launching a coordinated attack on the pā but at quite a heavy cost in casualties. The Colonial forces were unable to overcome the defences of the pā and retreated back to the Bay of Islands.

== Battle of Te Ahuahu ==
The next major engagement was the Battle of Te Ahuahu. The contemporary European accounts of the battle describe it as being fought on 12 June 1845 near Te Ahuahu and that it involved only the warriors of Hōne Heke fighting the warriors of Tāmati Wāka Nene. However, there are no detailed accounts of the action; Hugh Carleton (1874) mentions

Heke committed the error (against the advice of Pene Taui) of attacking Walker [Tāmati Wāka Nene], who had advanced to Pukenui. With four hundred men, he attacked about one hundred and fifty of Walker's party, taking them also by surprise; but was beaten back with loss. Kahakaha was killed, Haratua was shot through the lungs.

Thomas Walker was a name adopted by Tāmati Wāka Nene. In this battle Nene's warriors carried the day. Heke was severely wounded and did not rejoin the conflict until some months later, at the closing phase of the Battle of Ruapekapeka. On this account of the early engagements of the Flagstaff War, Kawiti appears to have made the better strategic decisions as to which battles to fight and which not to.

== Battle of Ōhaeawai ==
A debate occurred between Kawiti and the Ngatirangi chief Pene Taui as to the site of the next battle; Kawiti eventually agreed to the request to fortify Pene Taui's pā at Ōhaeawai.

The Colonial forces arrived before the Ōhaeawai Pā on 23 June and established a camp about 500 metres (1,600 ft) away. On the summit of a nearby hill (Puketapu) they built a four gun battery. They opened fire next day and continued until dark but did very little damage to the palisade. The next day the guns were brought to within 200 metres (660 ft) of the pā. The bombardment continued for another two days but still did very little damage. Partly this was due to the elasticity of the flax covering the palisade but the main fault was a failure to concentrate the cannon fire on one area of the defences.

After two days of bombardment without effecting a breach, Lieutenant Colonel Despard ordered a frontal assault. He was, with difficulty, persuaded to postpone this pending the arrival of a 32-pound naval gun which came the next day, 1 July. However an unexpected sortie from the pā resulted in the temporary occupation of the knoll on which Tāmati Wāka Nene had his camp and the capture of Nene's colours – the Union Flag. The Union Flag was carried into the pā. There it was hoisted, upside down, and at half-mast high, below the Māori flag, which was a Kākahu (Māori cloak). This insulting display of the Union Jack was the cause of the disaster which ensued. Infuriated by the insult to the Union Jack, Despard ordered an assault upon the pā the same day. The attack was directed to the section of the pā where the angle of the palisade allowed a double flank from which the defenders of the pā could fire at the attackers; the attack was a reckless endeavour. The British persisted in their attempts to storm the unbreached palisades and five to seven minutes later 33 were dead and 66 injured.

== Battle of Ruapekapeka ==
Towards the end of 1845 the British launched a major expedition against Kawiti's new pā at Ruapekapeka. It took two weeks to bring the heavy guns into range of the pā, they started the cannon bombardment on 27 December 1845. The siege continued for some two weeks with enough patrols and probes from the pā to keep everyone alert. Then, early in the morning of Sunday, 11 January 1846, William Walker Turau, the brother of Eruera Maihi Patuone, discovered that the pā appeared to have been abandoned; although Te Ruki Kawiti and a few of his warriors remained behind, and appeared to have been caught unaware by the British assault. Fighting took place behind the pā and most casualties occurred in this phase of the battle.

The reason why the defenders appeared to have abandoned but then re-entered the pā is the subject of continuing debate. It was later suggested that most of the Māori had been at church, many of them were devout Christians. Knowing that their opponents, the British, were also Christians they had not expected an attack on a Sunday.

It was Māori custom that the place of a battle where blood was spilt became tapu so that the Ngāpuhi left Ruapekapeka Pā. After the battle Kawiti and his warriors, carrying their dead, travelled some four miles north-west to Waiomio, the ancestral home of the Ngāti Hine. After the battle of Ruapekapeka Kawiti expressed the will to continue to fight, however Kawiti and Heke made it known that they would end the rebellion if the Colonial forces would leave the Ngāpuhi land.Tāmati Wāka Nene acted as the intermediary in the negotiations, with Nene persuading the Governor to accept the terms of Kawiti and Heke – that they were to be unconditionally pardoned for their rebellion.

== Aftermath of the Flagstaff War ==
After the conclusion of the Flagstaff War Kawiti went to live near Henry Williams at Pakaraka, and was baptised by Williams in 1853. He succumbed to measles on 5 May 1854 at Otaikumikumi, close to Waiomio which is south of Kawakawa. The meeting house and marae complex at Waiomio Caves are his memorial.

== Legacy of Kawiti and the fifth flagpole at Kororāreka ==
At the conclusion of the Flagstaff War, the Hokianga and the Bay of Islands region was nominally under British influence; the fact that the government's flag was not re-erected was symbolically very significant. Such significance was not lost on Henry Williams, who, writing to E. G. Marsh on 28 May 1846, stated that "the flag-staff in the Bay is still prostrate, and the natives here rule. These are humiliating facts to the proud Englishman, many of whom thought they could govern by a mere name."

Some argue that the Flagstaff War can be considered an inconclusive stalemate, as both sides wished the war to end, both gained somewhat from the fighting, and the situation more or less remained the same as it was before the outbreak of hostilities. The opinion of Henry Williams, who had counseled Kawiti to abandon the rebellion, was that the Ngāpuhi and the colonial government both agreed that each should let the other alone, so that Kawiti achieved peace on his terms. Henry Williams wrote to his son-in-law Hugh Carleton on 13 March 1854 in response to an earlier comment by Carleton as to the consequences of Kawiti having made peace with Governor Grey:

But you say, "Grey will go upon Kawiti's submission as a proof of victory." I ask you in what form was Kawiti's submission? and to what and when did it take place? This is new to me, as also to Kawiti. Compare Kawiti's letter to Governor FitzRoy with the proclamation of Grey, immediately on Grey's return to Auckland, after Te Ruapekapeka was upset, or before peace was made, that all parties were to return to their own places, keeping in mind that the bone of contention was the flag-staff. Nothing was demanded from the chiefs in arms; nothing was given; but Kawiti demanded in his letter that if peace were made, it should be made with respect to the land. This was acceded to by Grey, and the flag-staff has remained prostrate to this day, though several attempts have been made to re-erect it. Captain Stanley was applied to replace it; he consented to do so immediately, but asked,--who would take care of it. Major Bridge declared it would take a thousand men to keep it in its place. Why? the natives had gained their point, and to this day laugh at the idea of submission. Peace was made with the natives on the understanding that each should let the other alone, and the demands of Kawiti having been complied with by Grey, where is the evidence of Kawiti's submission? Rather, does not the evidence shew Grey's submission to Kawiti? The war was a perfect farce, both in the North and in the South.

Upon the death of Kawiti, his son Maihi Paraone Kawiti, who had been a missionary teacher at Mangakahia, succeeded Kawiti as leader of the Ngāti Hine hapū. Maihi Paraone Kawiti was a supporter of te ture (the law) and te whakapono (the gospel). Deputations came to Maihi Paraone Kawiti from the Taranaki and Waikato iwi asking the Ngāpuhi to join the Māori King Movement; the reply from Maihi Paraone Kawiti was that the Ngāpuhi had no desire for a ‘Māori Kingi’ as ‘Kuini Wikitoria’ was their ‘Kingi'.

Maihi Paraone Kawiti, as a signal to Governor Thomas Gore Browne that he did not follow his father's path, arranged for the fifth flagpole to be erected at Kororāreka; this occurred in January 1858 with the flag being named Whakakotahitanga, "being at one with the Queen." As a further symbolic act, the 400 Ngāpuhi warriors involved in preparing and erecting the flagpole were selected from the ‘rebel’ forces of Kawiti and Heke – that is, Ngāpuhi from the hapū of Tāmati Wāka Nene (who had fought as allies of the British forces during the Flagstaff War), observed, but did not participate in the erection of the fifth flagpole. The restoration of the flagpole was presented by Maihi Paraone Kawiti as a voluntary act on the part of the Ngāpuhi that had cut it down in 1845, and they would not allow any other to render any assistance in this work.

The legacy of Kawiti's rebellion during the Flagstaff War was that during the time of Governor Grey and Governor Thomas Gore Browne, the colonial administrators were obliged to take account of opinions of the Ngāpuhi before taking actions in the Hokianga and Bay of Islands. The continuing symbolism of the fifth flagpole at Kororāreka is that it exists because of the goodwill of the Ngāpuhi.

== Bibliography ==
- Kawiti, Tawai (October 1956). Hekes War in the North. No. 16 Ao Hou, Te / The New World, National Library of New Zealand Library. pp. 38–46.
