= Lake Tauanui =

Lake in New Zealand

- Location within Northland Region
- Location: Northland Region, North Island
- Coordinates: 35.5009°S 173.8484°E
- Basin countries: New Zealand
- Surface area: 6.2 ha (15 acres)
- Average depth: 9 m (30 ft)

Lake Tauanui (also Lake Kereru, Lake Tautoro,) is a 6.2 ha (15 acres) lake in the Northland Region of New Zealand. The lake is presently surrounded by native forest.

== Geography ==
The lake is between the peak of Tautoro to its east which raises to 463 m (1,519 ft) and the volcanic scoria cone of Tauanui to its northwest. It contains an island known locally as Motuharangi (or Motuwharangi), which in 1914 was about 1.5 acres (0.61 ha) in area with in the 35 acres (14 ha) of the lake.

== History ==
Analysis of lake sediments suggested it formed about 5500 years ago. The area was likely affected by local volcanic events and pollen studies showed surrounding rimu dominant mixed conifer-hardwood forest also containing kauri. About 4000 years ago the climate became cooler and drier with fire in the lake's catchment and from then to about a thousand years ago there was more fluctuation in the forest species present than before. There was significant decline in all tree and shrub elements after this with an increase in bracken pollen, particularly that of bracken fern. Fires were more common and after the arrival of Europeans, herb pollen increased markedly.

== Culture ==
Motuharangi island is tapu.

== See also ==
- List of lakes in New Zealand
