= Kaikohe Aerodrome =

- IATA: KKO; ICAO: NZKO

Summary
- Operator: Far North Holdings Ltd.
- Location: Kaikohe, New Zealand
- Coordinates: 35°27′10.22″S 173°49′0.17″E

Map
- Location of aerodrome in Northland

Runways
Direction	Length		Surface
Direction	ft	m	Surface
13/31	3,035	925	Grass
17/35	5,052	1,540	Grass

Kaikohe Aerodrome is an airfield south-east of Kaikohe in the Northland region of New Zealand. Built in 1942 as a US Marines bomber base, is the largest grass strip in the Southern hemisphere used now by general aviation. Other than powered aircraft, gliders use the airfield, and an area next to the runways is used by model airplane flyers. There are skydiving operations as well, with a landing spot near the old terminal.

== History ==
Kaikohe airport was built in 1942 as a US Marines bomber base during World War II. The site chosen is a small plateau, and was deemed suitable as it is large and flat with a solid volcanic foundation. The runway was the longest in Northland and was able to sustain heavy landings by bombers, which made it unique in comparison to other aerodromes in Northland. The Okaihau Branch Railway wrapped around the airport when the airport was constructed, but the line closed in 1987. The airport was constructed with one long main runway, and a shorter runway roughly perpendicular to the main one.

After the war the airport was converted to civilian use. On 23 January 1947, New Zealand National Airways Corporation (NAC) began the first commercial passenger air service to Kaikohe as part of an Auckland–Whangarei–Kaikohe–Kaitaia service. The aircraft flown were Lockheed Electras and de Havilland Dominies. On 15 May 1950, NAC introduced the larger Lockheed Lodestar on its services to Kaikohe and Kaitaia. The Lodestar was unable to use Whangarei's Onerahi Airport and so flights went directly from Auckland to Kaikohe. The new service promised some real benefits for Kaikohe including an increase from the six seats of the Dominies to fifteen seats, an increase in freight-carrying capacity and a reduction in the time of the flight to Auckland from 70 to 45 minutes. This was the actual flying time but the "time-saving" was considerably increased because the Lodestar flew direct to Auckland, consequently the time formerly spent at Whangarei was saved. Introduced at the same time was a Whangarei–Kaikohe feeder service that was operated by Dominies. For a time Kaikohe was linked to three destinations, being Auckland, Whangarei and Kaitaia.

The Lodestars did not last long on the Northland service, for on 2 April 1951 Douglas DC-3s were introduced on the Auckland–Kaikohe–Kaitaia route. The feeder service from Whangarei was discontinued at the same time. The new DC-3 service continued to operate on this timetable until 1964, when it again arrived from Auckland via Whangarei. In 1967, the air service was in jeopardy as it had handled the fewest passengers of any of NAC's destinations. In 1969, it was reported NAC carried only 5000 passengers through Kaikohe, an average of seven in and seven out daily. In 1970, Kaikohe lost its air service with NAC due to this low patronage and the fact the DC3s that were in use being replaced by larger Fokker Friendships, which could not handle the uneven grass runways.

In July 1970, Rotorua-based Geyserland Airways were successful in picking up the rights to fly to Kaikohe gaining a licence to operate an Auckland–Kaikohe service with an Aero Commander 680FL aircraft. This service proved profitable and in 1972 this service was transferred to a new airline, Air North. In 1975, Mount Cook Airline begun flying into Kerikeri Airport and this reduced passenger numbers into Kaikohe Airport as there was now an alternative for people flying into the Bay of Islands. Air North transferred rights to the route in 1978 to the Auckland Aero Club through their passenger arm, NZ Air Charter. This was discontinued in 1982. In 1983, a new airline Mid North Air begun an air service to Kaikohe. This proved uneconomic and ended the same year.

This marked the end of scheduled air services to Kaikohe, as the sealed runway in Kerikeri was much preferred to the grass runway in Kaikohe for airlines flying into the Bay of Islands.

The airport became popular with gliding over the next few years, as a base for local aerial topdressing aircraft operations, and skydiving.

== Operational information ==
- Lighting: Nil
- Fuel: Air BP Avgas swipecard

== Glider operations ==
Gliders commonly use the airfield. Runway 17/35 is used for gliding operations, and use the west side of the runway. Powered aircraft use the other side of the runway during these operations. The 140 metre wide runway is split so that powered aircraft use a 60+ metre wide section, and the remainder is for the gliders. However, for an emergency landing all three runways are open. Gliders tend to only use the strip Thursdays and weekends.

== Sources ==
- AIP Aerodrome Chart for NZKO (PDF)
