= Kaikohe-Bay of Islands volcanic field =

Dormant volcanic field in northern New Zealand

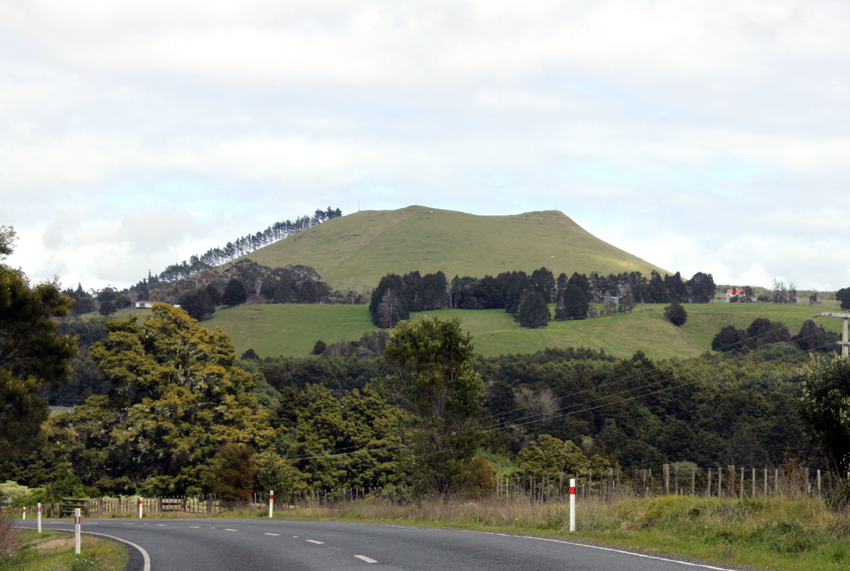
- Te Ahuahu, looking from Waimate North

Highest point
- Coordinates: 35.348316°S 173.848686°E

Geography
- Location within Northland Region

Geology
- Rock age: 20–0.0013 Ma
- Last eruption: 1300 to 1800 years ago

The recently active basaltic Kaikohe-Bay of Islands volcanic field in the Northland region of New Zealand is associated geographically with an older region of extinct volcanism to its north the Wairakau Volcanic Centre, meaning eruptions in this region have occurred over the last 20 million years. All the cones older than 2 million years have eroded away, leaving plateaus from Ōkaihau to Kerikeri and north to Whangaroa from the old andesite/dacite stratovolcanoes of the Wairakau Volcanic Centre and the ten million year old or more recent volcanoes in field towards the south. In the southern part of the field, around 12 small basaltic scoria cones, and a rhyolite dome erupted in the last 500,000 years around Kaikohe. The field is considered dormant, rather than extinct.

Map to emphasise selected recent surface volcanic features of the dormant Kaikohe volcanic field. Legend: Scoria vents (large squares) less than a million years old; eroded vents (small squares) from about 20 million years ago; lava fields less than a million years old; ancient volcanic deposits associated with the stratovolcanoes of the Wairakau Volcanic Centre are to the north in red and are from about 20 million years ago; To enlarge the map and enable mouseover of volcano feature/wikilinks click on the rectangle shape.

Map of more detailed volcanic features of the dormant Kaikohe volcanic field allowing wider context. Legend: Key for the volcanics that are shown with panning is: basalt (shades of brown/orange); monogenetic basalts; undifferentiated basalts of the Tangihua Complex in Northland Allochthon; arc basalts; arc ring basalts; dacite; andesite (shades of red); basaltic andesite; rhyolite (ignimbrite is lighter shades of violet); plutonic; White shading is selected caldera features.; Clicking on the rectangle icon enables full window and mouse-over with volcano name/wikilink and ages before present.

== Tectonics ==
The field is part of the eastern Northland volcanic belt which extends south to the Whangārei volcanic field near Whangārei and the south east volcanics of the Taurikura volcanic complex as found in the Hen of the Hen and Chicken Islands. In the north this belt extends towards the Three Kings Ridge. As such, a large number and types of volcanics are adjacent. It is arc related to the continent-backarc transform Vening Meimesz fault zone to the east of the present Northland land mass which is the eastern boundary of the Northland Allochthon in Zealandia.

== List of volcanoes ==
The volcanoes in the southern part of the field include:

- Kaikohe Hill
- Maungaturoto
- Pouerua
- Putahi
- Tarahi
- Tauanui
- Te Ahuahu
- Te Puke – last erupted 1300 to 1800 years ago
