= Te Ahuahu =

Fort and hill in New Zealand

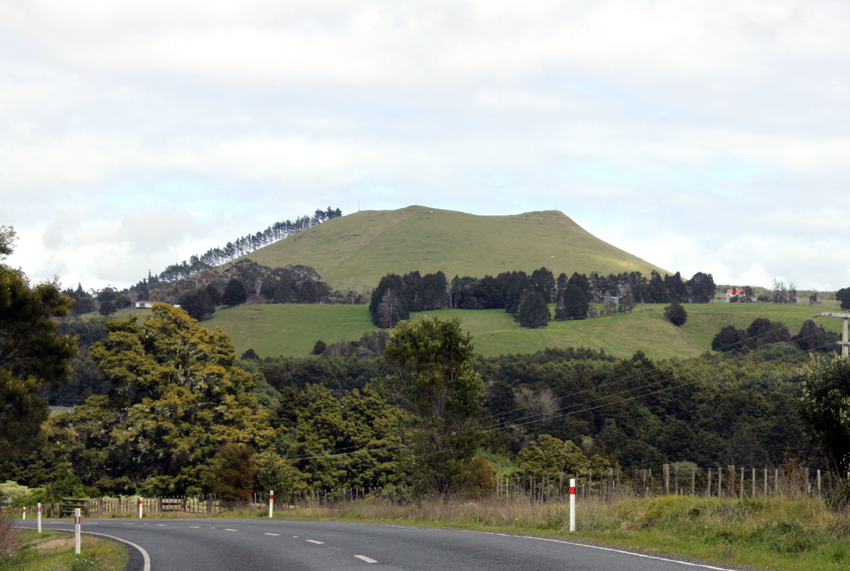
- Te Ahuahu, looking from Waimate North

Highest point
- Elevation: 373 m (1,224 ft)
- Coordinates: 35.339284°S 173.84109°E

Geography
- Te Ahuahu (red marker) and associated scoria and lava fields. Tarahi is to the south. Legend: Key for the volcanics that are shown with panning is: basalt (shades of brown/orange); monogenetic basalts; undifferentiated basalts of the Tangihua Complex in Northland Allochthon; arc basalts; arc ring basalts; dacite; andesite (shades of red); basaltic andesite; rhyolite (ignimbrite is lighter shades of violet); plutonic; White shading is selected caldera features.; Clicking on the rectangle icon enables full window and mouse-over with volcano name/wikilink and ages before present.

Geology
- Rock age: Pleistocene
- Mountain type: Basaltic scoria cone
- Rock type: Basalt

Te Ahuahu is a 373 m (1,224 ft) high andesitic basaltic scoria cone to the east of Lake Ōmāpere, in the Kaikohe-Bay of Islands volcanic field in New Zealand.

== History ==
It was the site of the pā of Hōne Heke – a highly influential Māori rangatira (chief) of the Ngāpuhi iwi (tribe) – that was the scene of the Battle of Te Ahuahu during the Flagstaff War of 1845–46. Here on 12 June 1845 a Maori raiding party led by Tāmati Wāka Nene captured the pā after Heke left it to gather food. During failed attempts to retake the pā, Heke was seriously wounded when shot in the thigh and at least 30 of his men were killed or wounded.
