= Lake Ōmāpere =

Lake in New Zealand

- Location within Northland Region
- Interactive map of Lake Ōmāpere
- Location: Far North District, Northland Region, North Island
- Coordinates: 35°21′S 173°47′E
- Primary outflows: Utakura River
- Catchment area: 3,392.8 hectares (8,384 acres)
- Basin countries: New Zealand
- Max. length: 5 km (3.1 mi)
- Surface area: 1,231.5 hectares (3,043 acres)
- Max. depth: 2–3 m (6.6–9.8 ft)
- Surface elevation: 237 metres (778 ft)

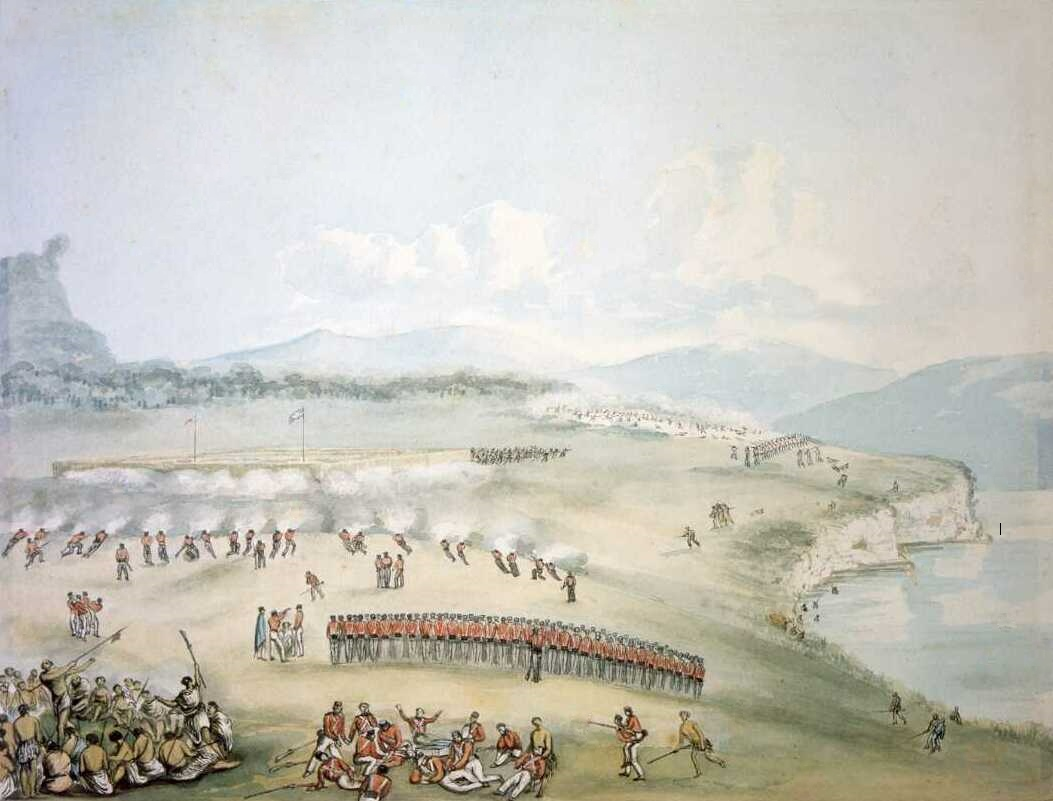
1845 drawing of Lake Omapere (to the right) with a battle in progress around the outer perimeter of Puketutu Pa.

Lake Ōmāpere is the largest lake in the Northland Region of New Zealand. It is located to the North of Kaikohe.

The lake sits within the Kaikohe-Bay of Islands volcanic field. The lake was formed when an ancient lava flow blocked a valley, forming the northern shoreline. It is five kilometres (3.1 mi) in length and covers 12.3 square kilometres (4.7 sq mi), however it is only 2.6 metres (8 ft 6 in) deep (and as low as 1.5 metres [4 ft 11 in] during summer). The lake has few inflow streams, mostly in the southern part of the lake. The Utakura River (south-western margin) is the main outflow which goes to the Hokianga Harbour. The lake catchment is predominantly pasture, with a few areas of native scrub and mature bush.

== Culture and history ==
Lake Ōmāpere is of great cultural and environmental value to Māori tangata whenua.

In May 1845 the Battle of Puketutu, an engagement of the Flagstaff War, occurred at the pā of Hōne Heke at Puketutu, on the shores of Lake Ōmāpere.

The lake level was lowered between 1903 and 1929, but by 1947 silting had restored much of its level.

== Water quality and ecology ==
The water quality in the lake is generally poor and the lake is prone to blooms of toxic algae. The lake is monitored by Northland Regional Council, and the environmental information can be viewed on the LAWA website.

The Lake Ōmāpere Restoration and Management Project aims to develop and implement a voluntary lake management strategy that will work towards improving the health of the lake and help assist the Lake Omapere Trustees in their role as kaitiaki.
