= Geology of the Northland Region =

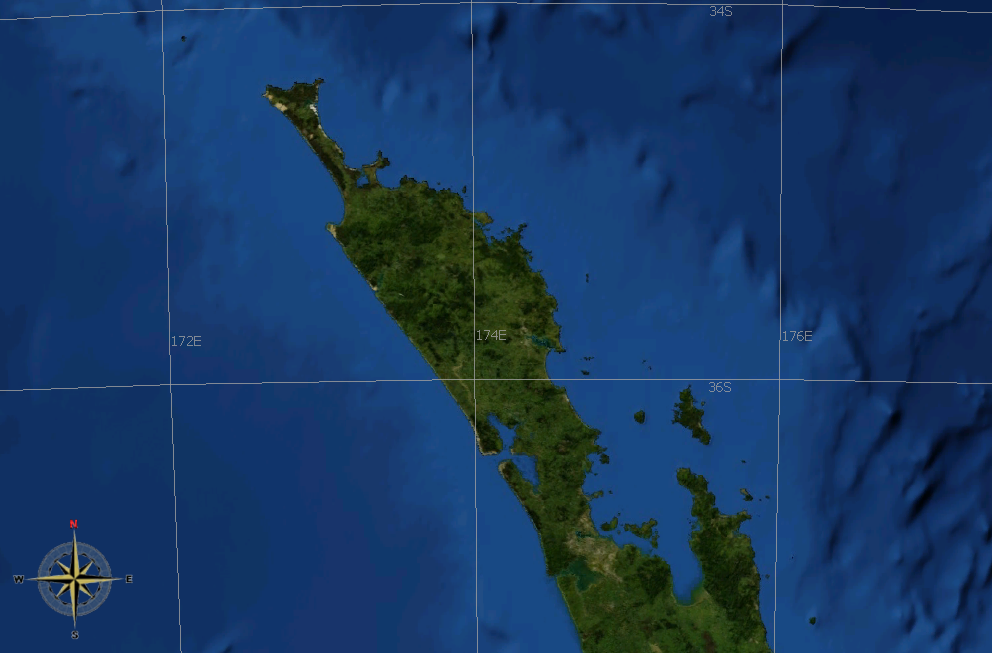
The Northland Region comprises the northern 80% of the Northland Peninsula.

New Zealand's Northland Region is built upon a basement consisting mainly of greywacke rocks, which are exposed on the eastern side of the peninsula. In-place Eocene coal measures crop out at Kamo, near Whangārei, and Oligocene limestone crops out at Hikurangi, near Whangārei.

A subduction zone is believed to have existed to the northeast of Northland in early Miocene times, causing the Northland Allochthon to thrust over much of the peninsula and volcanic belts to develop on either side of the peninsula. Intra-plate basaltic volcanic activity has occurred around Kaikohe, the Bay of Islands, and Whangārei since late Miocene times. Sand dunes sourced from volcanoes further south occupy much of the western coast, and the Aupouri Peninsula joins previously separate islands to the mainland to form a large tombolo.

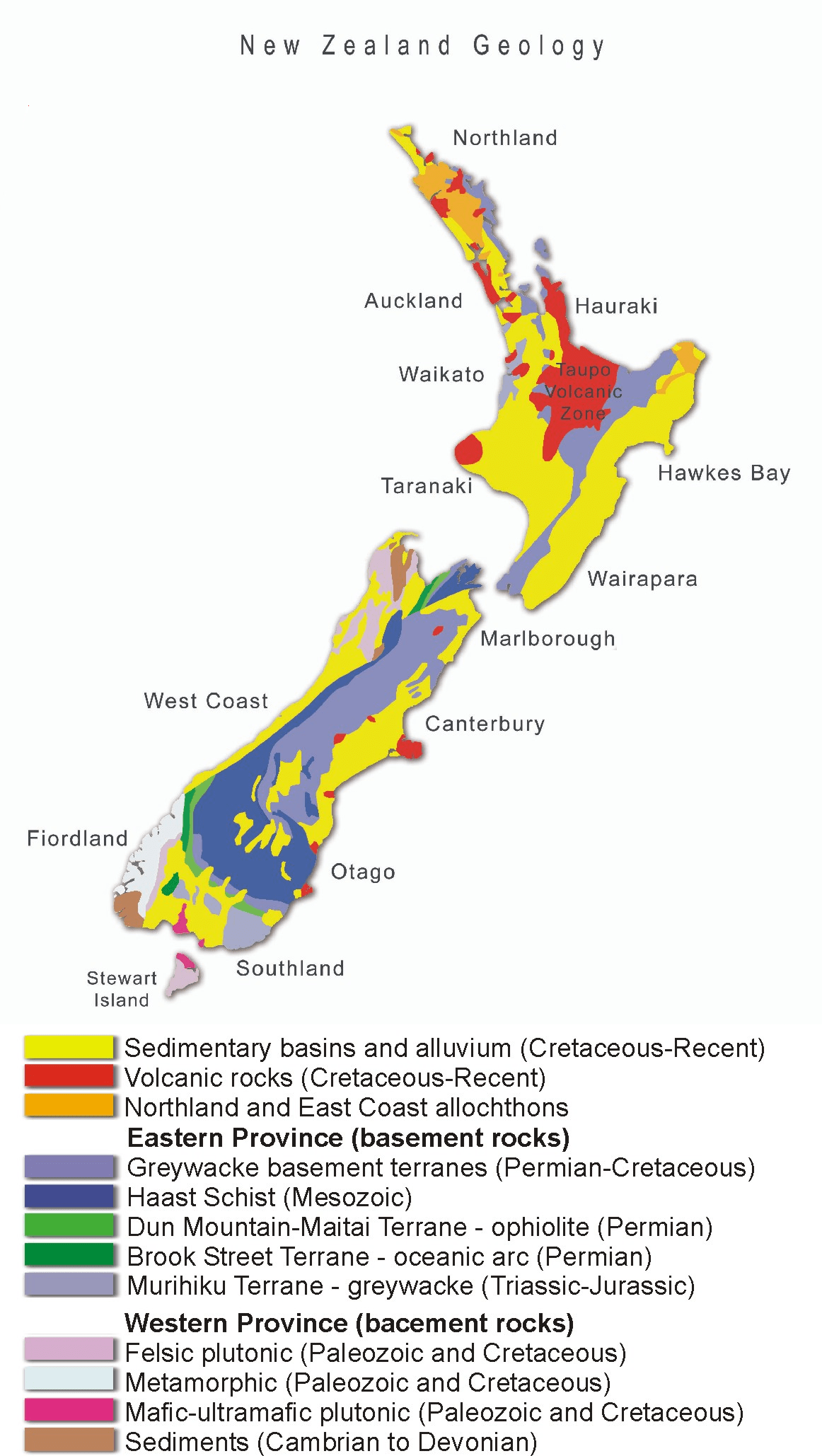
For context New Zealand geology map

== Basement rocks ==
As with most of New Zealand, the basement rocks of the Northland Region are mainly composed of greywacke (indurated sandstone), argillite, and chert, together with volcanic rocks, such as basalt pillow lava. The basement rocks are divided into a number of terranes, that are believed to have been combined together by subduction or strike-slip processes, by mid Cretaceous times (100 Ma).

Murihiku terrane rocks lie beneath the region on the western side, but do not crop out. The Murihiku terrane was formed in Late Triassic to Late Jurassic times (220–145 Ma).

A line of Dun Mountain–Maitai terrane rocks pass NNW–SSE through the centre of the region, separating the Murihiku terrane from the more easterly terranes, and produce a detectable junction magnetic anomaly (JMA), but do not crop out.

Caples terrane rocks crop out to form the Waipapa Horst (Omahuta and Puketi forest area). The Caples terrane was formed in Permian to Triassic times (300–200 Ma).

Hunua terrane rocks (part of the Waipapa composite terrane) crop out throughout much of eastern Northland, south of Whangaroa. The rocks are generally fine grained and highly deformed. The Hunua terrane was formed in Triassic to Jurassic times (250–145 Ma).

Mount Camel terrane rocks crop out near Mount Camel and the Karikari Peninsula. They were formed in the early Cretaceous (131–104 Ma).

== Te Kuiti group coal and limestone ==
The Te Kuiti Group Rocks overlie the basement rocks, and are present in Northland, Auckland, the Waikato, and King Country, although they have often been eroded or covered. Rocks containing coal were formed from swampland in Late Eocene times (37–34 Ma). The land sank, the sea transgressed, and calcareous sandstone, mudstone, and limestone were deposited in Oligocene times (34–24 Ma).

Eocene coal measures crop out in the east, between Kerikeri and Waipu. Coal has been mined around Kamo, north of Whangārei.

Limestone crops out around Whangārei, with an interesting display at the Waro Rocks Scenic Reserve, north of Hikurangi.

== Northland Allochthon ==
Map of selected surface volcanic features of Northland Region.
Legend
- Key for the volcanics that are shown with panning is:
- '"`UNIQ--templatestyles-00000005-QINU`"' basalt (shades of brown/orange)
- '"`UNIQ--templatestyles-00000006-QINU`"' monogenetic basalts
- '"`UNIQ--templatestyles-00000007-QINU`"'
  undifferentiated basalts of the Tangihua Complex in Northland Allochthon
- '"`UNIQ--templatestyles-00000008-QINU`"' arc basalts
- '"`UNIQ--templatestyles-00000009-QINU`"' arc ring basalts
- '"`UNIQ--templatestyles-0000000A-QINU`"'
  dacite
- '"`UNIQ--templatestyles-0000000B-QINU`"' andesite (shades of red)
- '"`UNIQ--templatestyles-0000000C-QINU`"' basaltic andesite
- '"`UNIQ--templatestyles-0000000D-QINU`"'
  rhyolite (ignimbrite is lighter shades of violet)
- '"`UNIQ--templatestyles-0000000E-QINU`"' plutonic
- White shading is selected caldera features.
- Clicking on the rectangle icon enables full window and mouse-over with volcano name/wikilink and ages before present.

In Early Miocene times (24–21 Ma), a series of thrust sheets was emplaced over Northland, extending as far south as the Kaipara Harbour and Albany areas. The rocks came from the northeast (perhaps beyond the Vening Meinesz Fracture Zone), and were emplaced in reverse order, but the right way up. The original rocks are of Cretaceous to Oligocene age (90–25 Ma), and include mudstone, limestone and basalt lava. These rocks outcrop around Silverdale, Warkworth, and Wellsford, reaching as far south as Albany. The allochthon includes displaced Te Kuiti group rocks. The basalt lava of the Tangihua Complex is believed to represent sea floor, that has been obducted onto Northland to form high standing massifs, such as the Reinga, Ahipara, Warawara, Mangakahia, and Maungataniwha massifs. Isolated bodies of serpentine occur at North Cape, and south of Maungaturoto.

The Northland and East Cape Allochthons are assumed to constitute part of a single allochthon, that have later separated, due to the clockwise rotation of the eastern part of the North Island, relative to the western part.

== Early Miocene volcanism ==
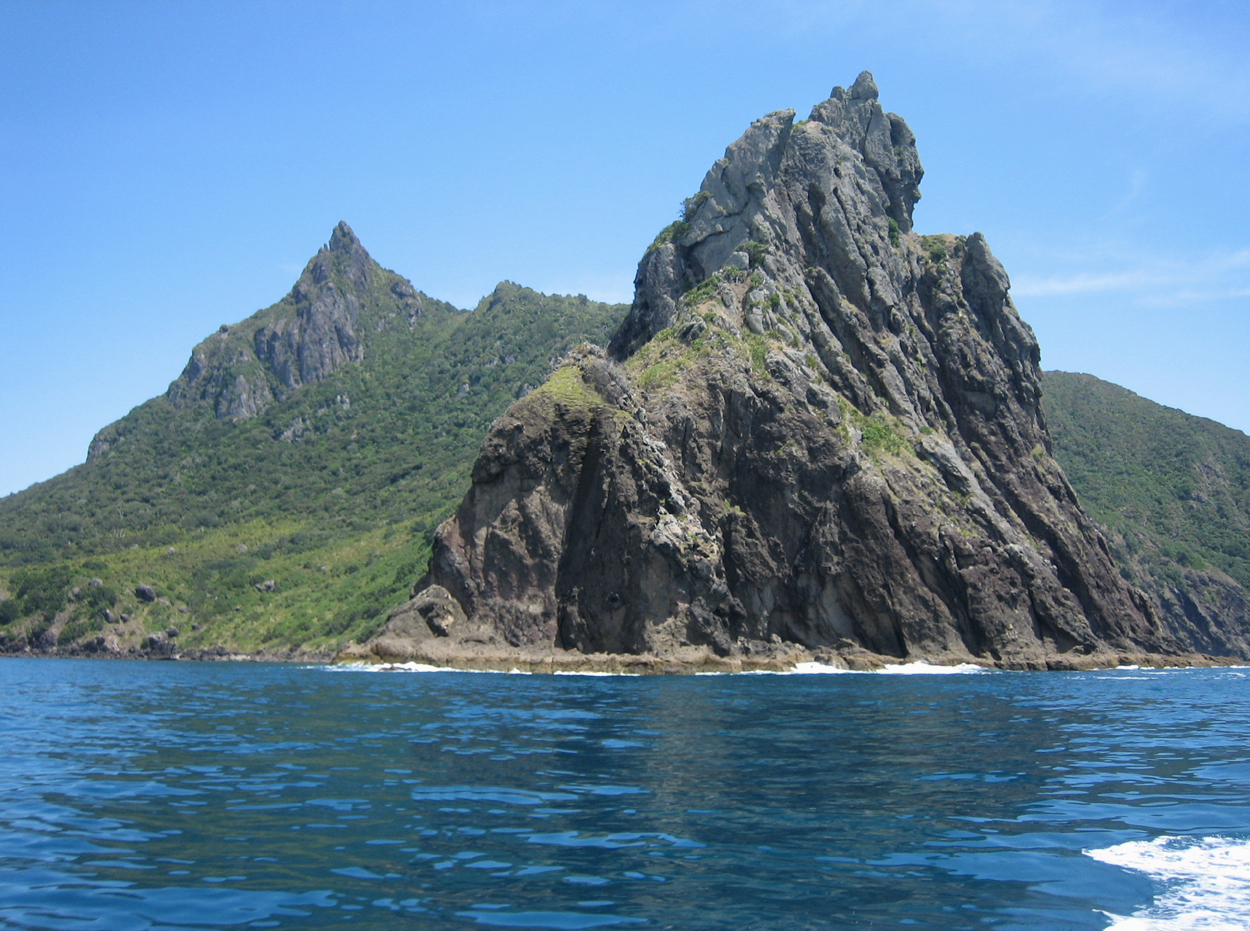
Bream Head is a remnant of one of the many Miocene volcanoes in the Northland Arc

A subduction-related volcanic belt became active to the west of the current land in Northland in Miocene times (23 Ma), and gradually moved south down to Taranaki. It produced mainly andesitic stratovolcanoes. Most of these volcanoes have been eroded, but remnants form the Waipoua Plateau (basaltic, 19–18 Ma), and Waitākere Ranges (andesitic, 22–16 Ma).

An eastern volcanic belt formed mainly andesitic volcanoes around Karikari (22.3–19.8 Ma), Whangaroa (20.5–17.5 Ma), Whangarei Heads (21.5–16.1 Ma), Bream Head, and created the Hen and Chicken Islands (19.5–16.5 Ma).

== Waitemata sandstone ==
Miocene volcanoes and the Northland Allochthon eroded to form the Waitemata sandstone, between Whangārei and Auckland, on the eastern side of Northland.

== Uplift ==
By middle Miocene, Northland was uplifted above sea level, with a slight westward tilt, exposing basement rocks on the eastern side, and resulting in a tendency for rivers to flow in a westerly direction.

== Recent basaltic volcanism ==
Intra-plate basaltic volcanism has occurred in Northland from late Miocene to Quaternary times. The Kerikeri volcanic group covered the area from Kaikohe, Kerikeri, to Whangārei. Activity began about 9 Ma, and the youngest cones are probably only tens of thousands of years old.

Little Barrier Island is the emergent part of a large dacitic-rhyodacitic stratovolcano, formed through two eruptive periods (3 Ma, and 1.6–1.2 Ma).

== Coastal dunes ==
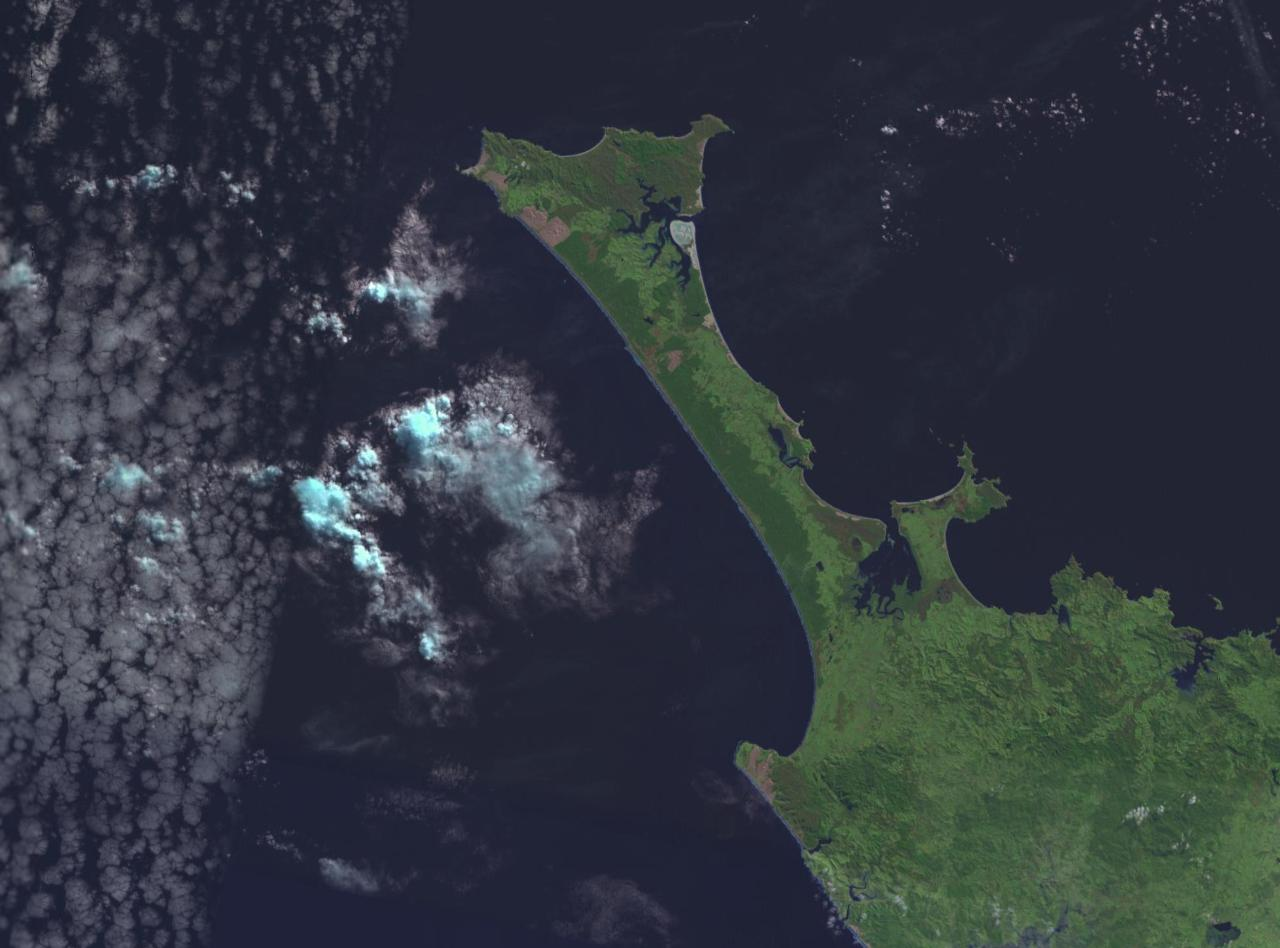
Satellite photo of the Aupouri Peninsula, which connects former islands including Cape Reinga with the rest of the North Island

The coastal barriers north and south of the entry to the Kaipara Harbour, are essentially consolidated sand dunes, built up over the last few million years. Similar dunes have formed in the north from Ahipara to Cape Reinga, connecting what used to be isolated islands to the rest of the North Island, thus creating a large tombolo. Sand on the eastern coast tends to be more pure quartz, and appears white.

== Geothermal areas ==
Hot springs exist at Ngawha Springs, with temperatures around 40–50 °C. There are also hot springs at Waiwera and Parakai, in the southern part of the Northland Peninsula, in the Auckland Region. All are used for hot pools. The Ngawha geothermal field is also used for the generation of electricity.

== Geological resources ==
Copper has been mined at Kaeo, silver, gold and mercury at Puhipuhi, and antimony at Russell.

Coal has been mined at Kawakawa, Hikurangi, Kamo and Kiripaka.

The Northland Basin, to the west of the Northland Peninsula is considered as having potential for oil and gas.

Halloysite clay is mined at Matauri Bay and Mahimahi.

High quality quartz sand is dredged from near Parengarenga Harbour.

== Geological hazards ==
The main geological hazard in Northland is the potential for landslides, particularly in mudstones and sandstones of the Northland Allochthon. Northland has the least incidence of earthquakes of anywhere in New Zealand. Volcanic activity is dormant rather than extinct. However, tsunamis generated by earthquakes around the Pacific can occur on the east coast.

== Geological sites of interest ==
Hunua terrane can be seen along much of the coast between the Bay of Islands and Whangārei. Mount Camel terrane can be seen at Parerake Bay, Karikari Peninsula.

Kamo coal measures can be seen near Kamo. Whangarei Limestone can be seen at Waro Rocks Scenic Reserve, north of Hikurangi.

Many of the hills in Northland are formed from the Tangihua Complex rocks of the Northland Allochthon.

Maungaraho, north of Tokatoka, gives a good example of a remnant of an early Miocene andesitic volcano. Whangārei Heads represents another example.

Sand dunes can be seen on either side of the coast between Kaitaia and Cape Reinga.

== Maps ==
Geological maps of New Zealand are now freely accessible on line from the New Zealand Institute of Geological and Nuclear Science (GNS Science), a New Zealand Government Research Institute.

There is also a 1:25 000 map of the Whangarei urban area, published in 2003.

== See also ==
- Geology of New Zealand
