= Taonui =

Taonui may refer to:

== Places ==
- Taonui, a statistical area within Hiwinui, a rural settlement in the Manawatū-Whanganui region, New Zealand
- Taonui railway station, a station in the Manawatū-Whanganui region, New Zealand

== People ==
- Aperahama Taonui (died 1882), New Zealand tribal leader
- Makoare Te Taonui (c. 1790–1862), New Zealand chief and father of Aperahama Taonui
- Taonui Hikaka (died 1892), New Zealand chief
