= James Everard Home =

British naval officer (1798–1853)

Captain Sir James Everard Home Bt CB FRS
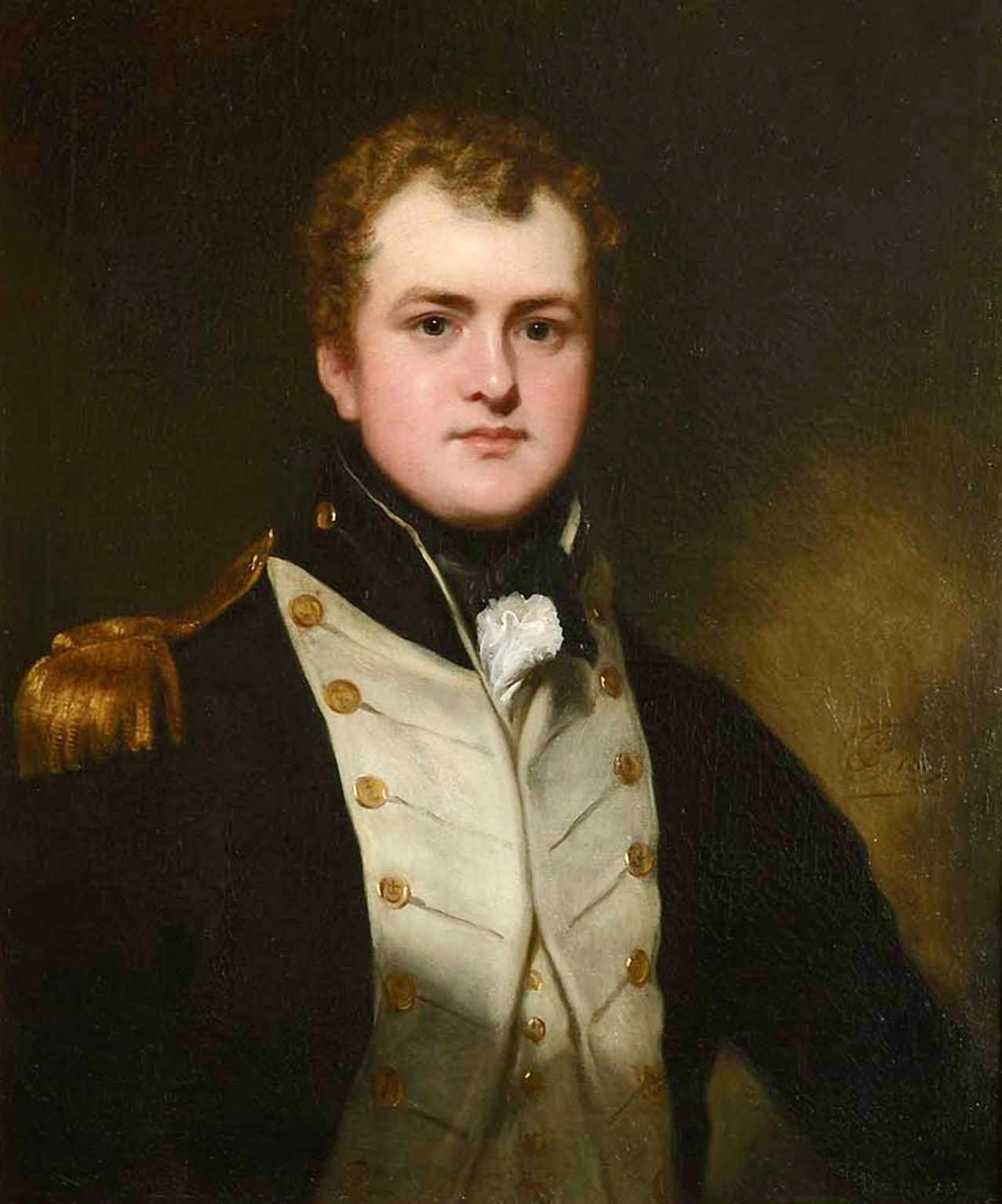
- Lieutenant James Everard Home, RN, 1819. Artist: Sir William Beechey RA
- Born: 25 October 1798; Well Manor, Hampshire
- Died: 2 November 1853 (aged 55); Sydney, New South Wales
- Burial place: Camperdown Cemetery, Sydney
- Relatives: Everard Home (father); Anne Home (aunt); John Hunter (uncle); Robert Home (uncle)
- Military career
- Allegiance: United Kingdom
- Branch: Royal Navy
- Service years: 1810–1853
- Rank: Captain
- Units: HMS Euryalus, 1810– HMS Malta, 1812– HMS Tonnant; HMS Sybille; HMS Larne; HMS Pique; HMS Helicon; HMS Racehorse, 1834–37; HMS North Star, 1841–46; HMS Calliope, 1850–53
- Commands: HMS Racehorse, 1834–37; HMS North Star, 1841–46; HMS Calliope, 1850–53
- Campaigns: First Opium War; Woosung; New Zealand Wars; Flagstaff War; Otuihu; Ruapekapeka
- Awards: Companion of the Most Honourable Military Order of the Bath; China War Medal (1842)
- Memorials: Memorial plaque, St James' Church, Sydney

Captain Sir James Everard Home, 2nd Baronet, CB, FRS (25 October 1798 – 1 November 1853) was a Royal Navy officer. On his travels in New Zealand, he collected many plants. He was elected to the Royal Society in 1825. Home Point in New Zealand is named after him.

== Early life ==
James Everard Home, born 25 October 1793, in London, was a son of Everard Home, a surgeon, and Jane, daughter of the Rev. James Tunstall and Elizabeth (née Dodsworth), and widow of Stephen Thompson.

His father was made 1st baronet, of Well Manor in the County of Southampton, on 2 January 1813. He succeeded his father as 2nd Baronet on 31 August 1832.

== Career ==
Home entered the Navy on 10 April 1810, as a midshipman on board the frigate HMS Euryalus under Captain George Dundas. From there he joined HMS Malta in the Mediterranean in August 1812, under Sir Benjamin Hallowell. Subsequently, he served with Hallowell on board HMS Tonnant at Cork. Upon arrival in the West Indies in the frigate HMS Sybille, he was promoted to the rank of Lieutenant on 14 July 1814, assigned to HMS Larne under Captain Abraham Lowe. HMS Pique, under Captain John Mackellar, followed. After eight months Home station service in HMS Helicon, he gained a second commission on 28 January 1822.

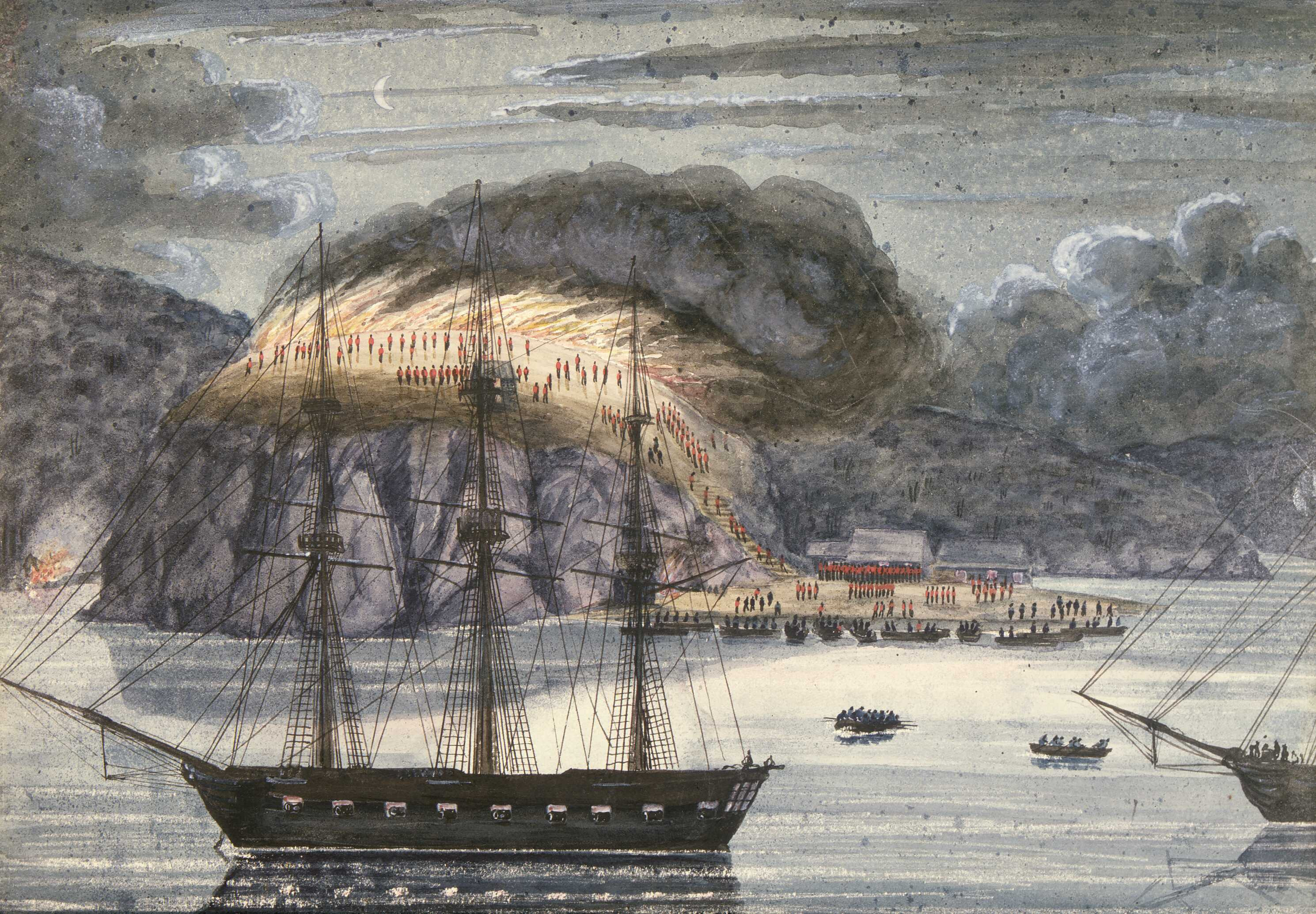
Lt Col. William Hulme burns Otuihu whilst Pōmare is held on board HMS North Star, 30 April 1845. Artist: John Williams, 58th Regt, 1845. Alexander Turnbull Library

Home was elected to fellowship of the Royal Society in 1825 with the citation:

Captain Everard Home RN of Sackville Street. A Gentleman well versed in several branches of nautical and astronomical Science, being desirous of becoming a Fellow of the Royal Society, we whose names are underwritten do from our personal knowledge recommend him as deserving of that honour and likely to prove a useful and valuable member.

He returned to sea again from 1 February 1834 to 5 December 1837 as commander of the 18-gun sloop HMS Racehorse (1830) serving in the West Indies.

From 30 August 1841 to 8 September 1846 he was captain of the corvette HMS North Star.

During the period 1841–42 she served at Canton with Sir William Parker's ships in the First Anglo-Chinese War (1839–42), popularly known as the First Opium War. Home was present at the taking of Woosung and Shanghai in mid June 1842, and operations on the Yangtze On 21 July 1842 North Star blockaded the Woosung River, Shanghai. Queen Victoria appointed Home to be a Companion of the Most Honourable Military Order of the Bath in December 1842.

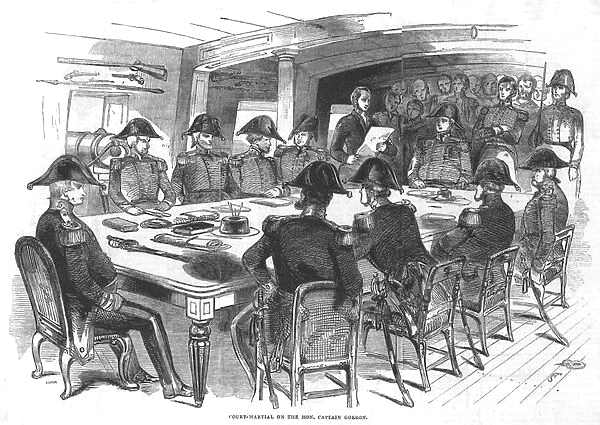
Court Martial on the Honourable Captain John Gordon, on board HMS Victory. The Pictorial Times, 1846

On 23 March 1845 North Star arrived in New Zealand. North Star operated in the Bay of Islands during the Flagstaff War between 11 March 1845 and 11 January 1846. On 30 April 1845 Pōmare was taken on board North Star and, following the burning of his pā, to Auckland. He was released after Tāmati Wāka Nene's intervention.

In 1846 Home took part in the trial of Captain John Gordon, HMS America, on charges of leaving the South American station in America without permission and contrary to the orders of the Commander in Chief, Rear Admiral Sir George Seymour, as well as bringing home a quantity of specie intended to have been shipped for England in the steamer Salamander or HMS Daphne.[12]

The Court was composed of: Admiral Sir Charles Ogle, Commander in Chief of her Majesty's ships and vessels at Portsmouth, President; Rear Admiral Hyde Parker; Captain John Pasco, HMS Victory; Captain Henry Ducie Chads, HMS Excellent; Captain Sir James Everard Home, HMS North Star; and Captain Jon Robb, HMS Gladiator.

From 28 November 1850 he was captain of the 28-gun sixth rate HMS Calliope until he died following a paralytic stroke in Sydney, New South Wales, Australia, on 1 November 1853.

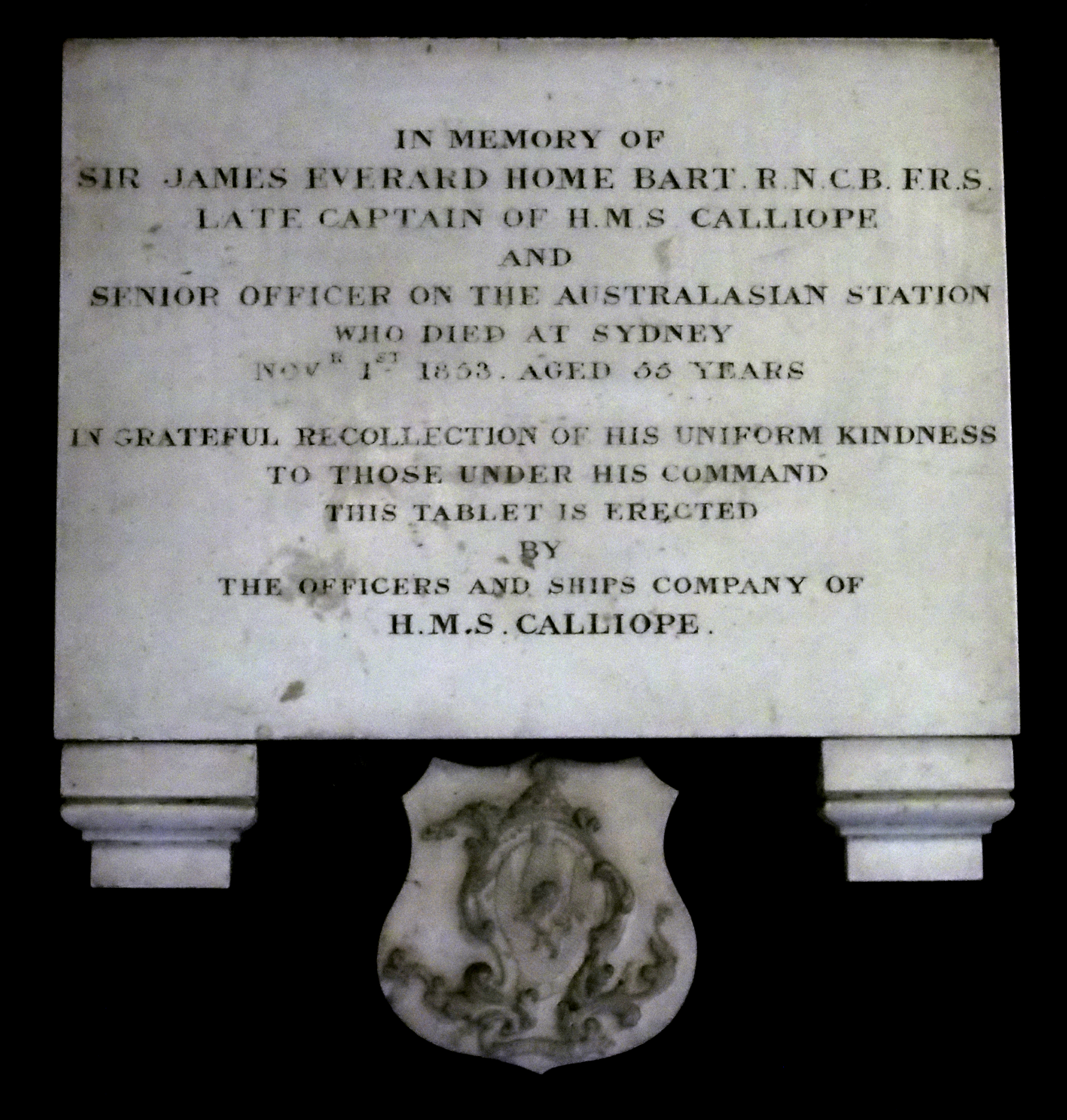
Memorial to Sir James Everard Home in St James' Church, Sydney

A memorial plaque to him is in St James' Church, Sydney.

== Legacy ==
James Everard Home collected a number of Polynesian artefacts during HMS North Star's 1844 South Sea cruise:

- A Samoan Tiputa. Coat of "Tapa" cloth fibre, 224 cm x 87 cm. Catalogue no. EBC 42861, Royal Botanic Gardens, Kew
- A Samoan wooden board and shells for extracting inner bark. Catalogue no. EBC 42887, Royal Botanic Gardens, Kew
- A Pandanus frame used to print Tapa cloth. Catalogue no. EBC 42914, Royal Botanic Gardens, Kew.

He collected plant species and corresponded with Sir William Hooker and Robert Brown. Plant species named after James Everard Home include:

- Alpinia homeana K. Schum. – from Fiji
- Geranium homeanum Turcz. – A Geranium from New Zealand
- Podonephelium homei (Seem.) Radlk. – A New Caledonian shrub

== Publications ==
- Home, James Everard (1843). "II. Observations of the Beginning and End of the Solar Eclipse on the 8th July, 1842. In the Fort on the left bank of the Shanghaie River, near to the Town of Woosung, on the Coast of China". Monthly Notices of the Royal Astronomical Society. 5 (29, 10 March). London: Royal Astronomical Society: 261. doi:10.1093/mnras/5.29.261a.
- Home, James Everard; Fisher, George (1843). "Magnetical Observations Made in the West Indies, on the Coasts of Brazil and North America, in the Years 1834, 1835, 1836 and 1837". Proceedings of the Royal Society of London. 4 (31 December). London: Royal Society of London: 3–4. doi:10.1098/rspl.1837.0002.
- Home, James Everard (1846). "New Zealand Hydrography—Extract from the Remarks of H.M.S. North Star, Capt. Sir E. Home, Bart., RN". The Nautical Magazine and Naval Chronicle, for 1846. No. November. London: Simpkin, Marshall, and Co. pp. 565–577 – via Internet Archive.
- Home, James Everard (1846). "Extracts from the Remarks of H.M.S. North Star. Capt. Sir E. Home, Bart.,—Woosung". The Nautical Magazine and Naval Chronicle, for 1846. No. December. London: Simpkin, Marshall, and Co. pp. 625–630 – via Internet Archive.
- Home, James Everard (1847). "Extracts from the Remarks of H.M.S North Star.—By Capt. Sir E. Home, Bart.—From Botany Bay to Hobart Town. (Continued from page 17.)". The Nautical Magazine and Naval Chronicle, for 1847. London: Simpkin, Marshall, and Co. pp. 84–86 – via Internet Archive.
- Home, James Everard (1849). "Notes Among the Islands of the Pacific.—Extracts from the Remarks of H.M.S. North Star: Capt. Sir E. Home, R.N." (PDF). The Nautical Magazine and Naval Chronicle, for 1849. London: Simpkin, Marshall, and Co. pp. 449–456, 580–589, 631–637.
- Home, James Everard (1850). "Notes Among the Islands of the Pacific.—Extracts from the Remarks of H.M.S. North Star: Capt. Sir E. Home, R.N." The Nautical Magazine and Naval Chronicle, for 1850. London: Simpkin, Marshall, and Co. pp. 35–38, 218–224, 259–263.

Baronetage of the United Kingdom
| Preceded by Everard Home | Baronet (of Well Manor); 1832–1853 | Extinct |
