= Flagstaff, New Zealand =

Flagstaff, New Zealand may refer to:

- Flagstaff (Otago), a hill overlooking the city of Dunedin
- Flagstaff, Hamilton, a suburb of Hamilton

== See also ==
- Flagstaff Hill (New Zealand) in the Bay of Islands
