= HMS Elphinstone =

No ships of the Royal Navy directly bore the name HMS Elphinstone. However there were three ships named Elphinstone of the East India Company and the Royal Indian Marine which had close associations with the Royal Navy. They are named after Lord Elphinstone.

- Elphinstone (1824) was an 18-gun sloop. She was built by Hilhouse & Sons and launched in 1824. She operated out of London as an East Indiaman and participated with the Royal Navy in the Flagstaff War in New Zealand. She was sold in 1862.
- HMINS Elphinstone (1887) was originally launched in 1887 as the merchant vessel Hindoo. She was purchased in the same year for use as a troopship by the Royal Indian Marine. She was on the sale list in 1919.
- HMINS Elphinstone (1921) was an Anchusa-class sloop built for the Royal Navy and launched as HMS Ceanothus. In 1921 she was transferred to the Royal Indian Marine and renamed Elphinstone. She was wrecked in 1925 off the Nicobar Islands.
