= Haimona Pita Matangi =

Māori chief (c. 1780 – 1839)

- Born: Matangi c. 1780
- Died: 1 January 1839; Utakura, Hokianga, Colony of New Zealand

Haimona Pita Matangi (born Matangi; c. 1780–1839) was a Māori rangatira (chief) of Waimā.

== Family ==
Matangi was born around 1780. His father was Te Wharemaru, a local rangatira in the Hokianga region. He was the nephew of Kauteāwhā and Tarewhare, and sibling to Karaitiana and Kūranga. He was believed to be the cousin and/or son-in-law of Makoare Te Taonui. He had five sons, including Pāora Mohi, and one daughter.

== Biography ==
Matangi was strongly involved with early missionaries in New Zealand, having met Thomas Kendall and John King in Hokianga on 29 June 1819, and Samuel Marsden in Ōraka on 29 September 1819. He himself converted to Christianity in late 1833, taking the baptismal name Haimona Pita, a Māori transliteration of the name Simon Peter, upon his Methodist baptism by the Reverend William White on 23 December 1833. His conversion appeared to have a great effect on his lifestyle, with one obituary describing his life before conversion as that of "a warrior, a cannibal, adulterer, and what not, and at one time was a complete pest to Europeans, and to his own countrymen." After his conversion, he was respected by both Church and Wesleyan missionaries, and had memorised the whole of the third chapter of Matthew by heart.

In 1831, he was one of the signatories in a letter addressed to King William IV, asking for protection from the king against French colonisation attempts, inter-tribal conflicts, and the misconduct of British subjects.

On 29 March 1836, he signed the codicil to the Declaration of Independence.

He died at Utakura in Hokianga on 1 January 1839, being over 60 years old.
