= Everard Home =

English surgeon (1756–1832)

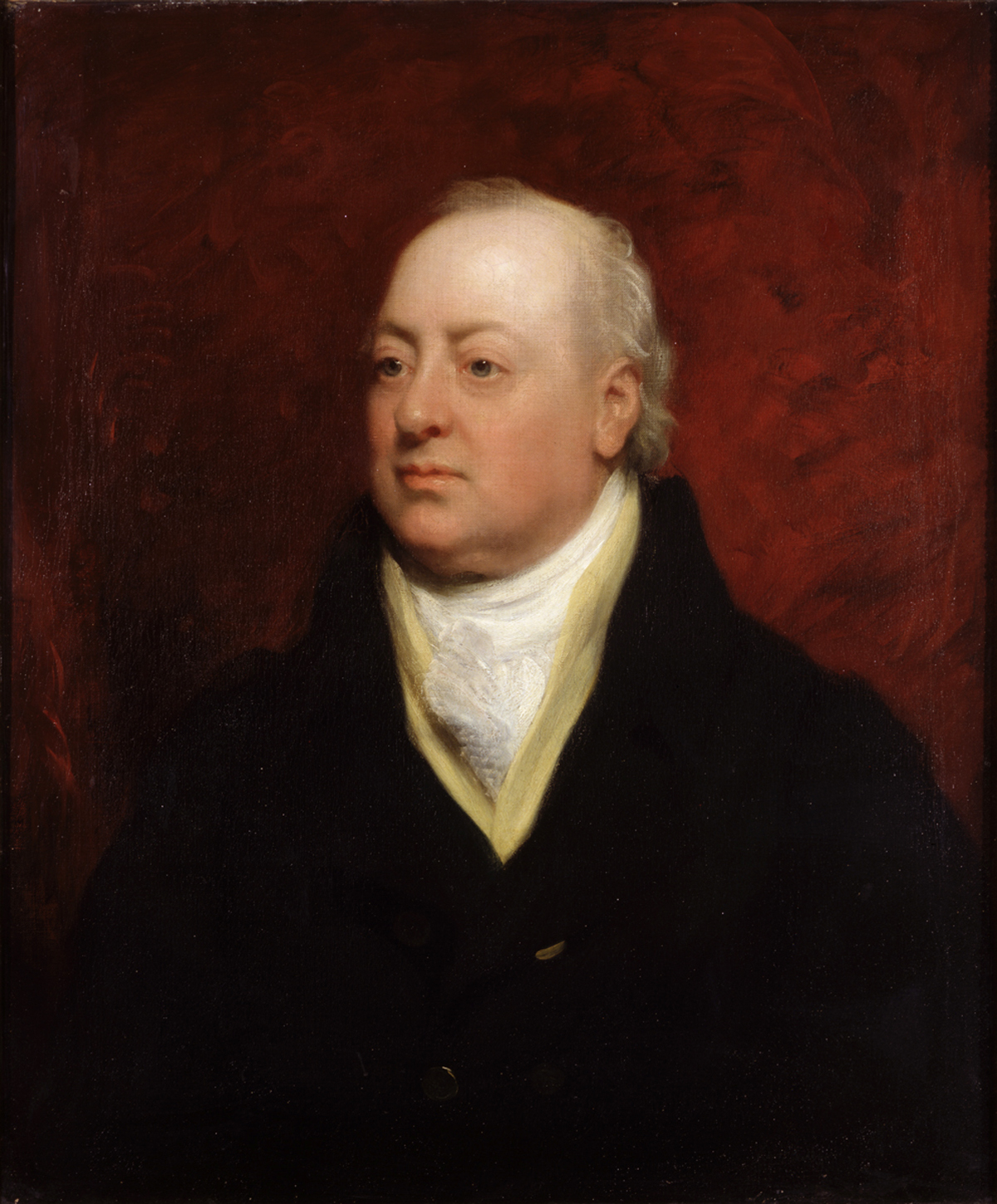
1829 portrait of Home by Thomas Phillips

Sir Everard Home, 1st Baronet, FRS (6 May 1756 – 31 August 1832) was an English surgeon.

== Life ==
Home was born in Kingston-upon-Hull and educated at Westminster School. He gained a scholarship to Trinity College, Cambridge, but decided instead to become a pupil of his brother-in-law, John Hunter, at St George's Hospital. Hunter had married his sister, the poet and socialite Anne Home, in July 1771. He assisted Hunter in many of his anatomical investigations, and in the autumn of 1776 he partly described Hunter's collection. There is also considerable evidence that Home plagiarized Hunter's work, sometimes directly, sometimes indirectly; he also systematically destroyed his brother-in-law's papers in order to hide evidence of this plagiarism. It seems likely that the fire (in Home's apartments at Chelsea Hospital) which destroyed the Hunterian manuscripts in Home's possession also destroyed a precious collection of 26 microscopes originally made by van Leeuwenhoek, which Home had borrowed from the Royal Society.^{:123}

Having qualified at Surgeons' Hall in 1778, Home was appointed assistant surgeon at the naval hospital, Plymouth. In 1787 he was appointed assistant surgeon, later surgeon, at St George's Hospital. He became Sergeant Surgeon to the King in 1808 and Surgeon at Chelsea Hospital in 1821. He was made a baronet (of Well Manor in the County of Southampton) in 1813.

He was elected a Fellow of the Royal Society in 1787, gave their Croonian Lecture many times between 1793 and 1829 and received their Copley Medal in 1807. He was elected a Foreign Honorary Member of the American Academy of Arts and Sciences in 1832.

== Works ==
Home published prolifically on human and animal anatomy. He was the first to describe the fossil creature (later 'Ichthyosaur') discovered near Lyme Regis by Joseph Anning and Mary Anning in 1812. Following John Hunter, he initially suggested it had affinities with fish. Home also did some of the earliest studies on the anatomy of platypus and noted that it was not viviparous, theorizing that it was instead ovoviviparous. He was also the first to propose that melanin acts a sunscreen.

A species of tortoise, Kinixys homeana Bell, 1827, is named in his honor.

== Family ==
His son, James Everard Home, became an eminent officer in the Royal Navy.

Baronetage of the United Kingdom
New creation	Baronet (of Well Manor); 1813–1832	Succeeded by James Everard Home
Preceded by Knighton baronets	Home baronets of Well Manor; 2 January 1813	Succeeded by Nagle baronets
