= Flagstaff Hill (New Zealand) =

Hill in New Zealand

Coordinates: 35.255003°S 174.119718°E

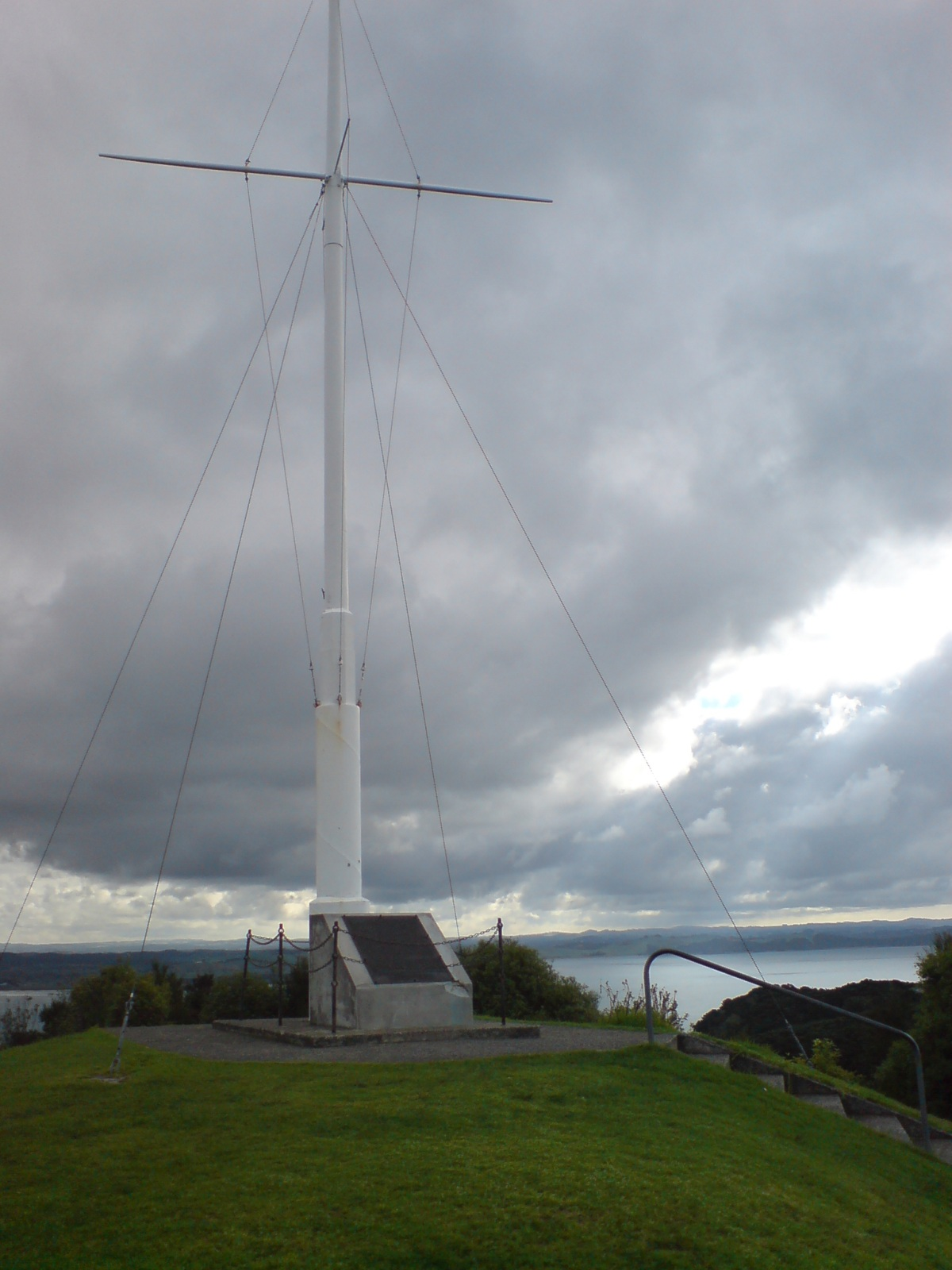
The modern-day flagstaff, remnant of the fifth flagstaff.

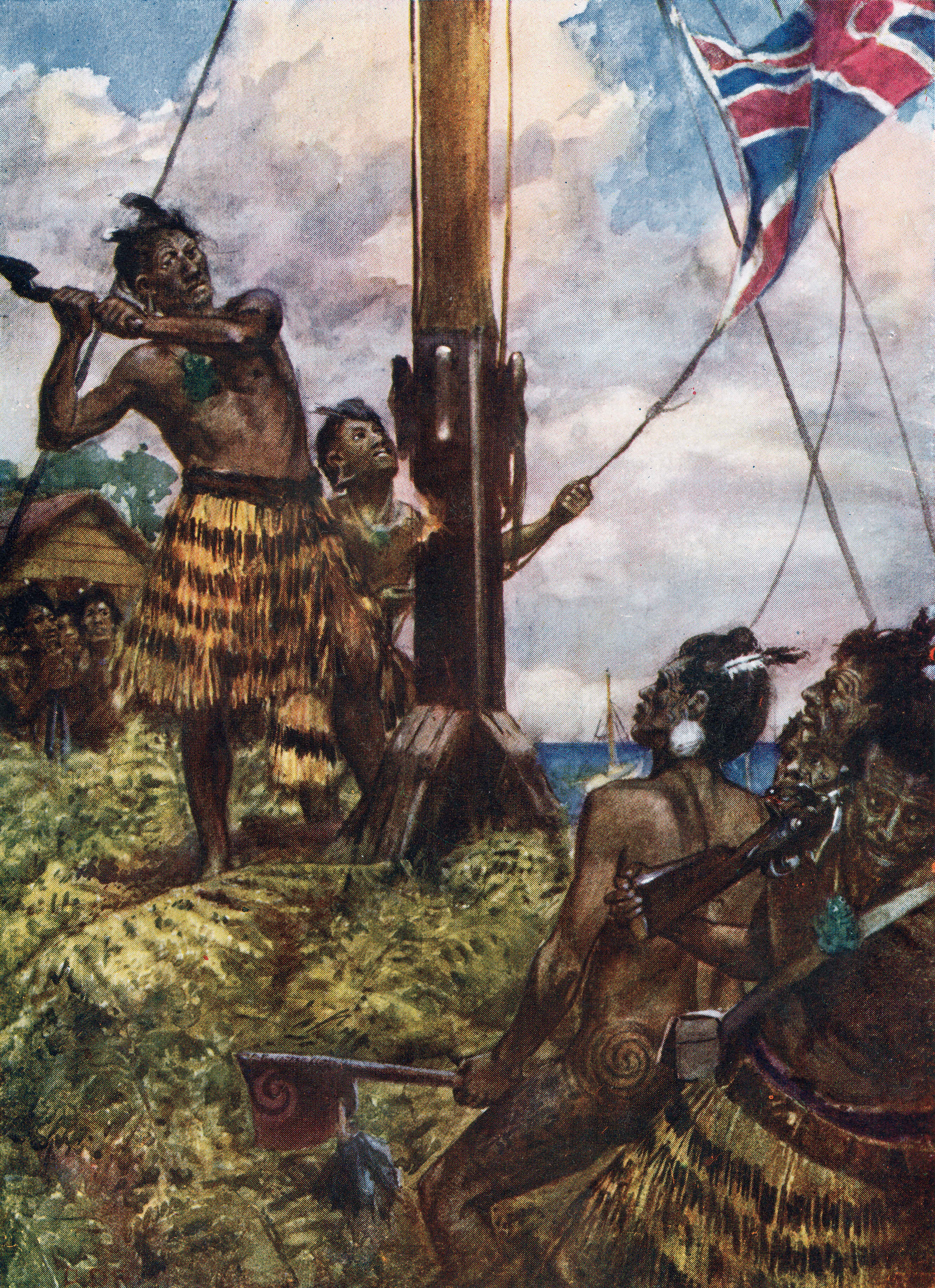
Hōne Heke fells the flagstaff at Kororāreka. Painting by Arthur David McCormick.

Flagstaff Hill (Maiki Hill) overlooks the Bay of Islands, New Zealand. Directly north of the small historical village of Russell, the flagstaff on the hill played a significant role in early relations between the local Māori of the Ngāpuhi iwi and early British colonials.

== History ==
After the Treaty of Waitangi was signed in February 1840 at Waitangi, across the bay, relations between the Ngāpuhi and Pākehā (used by the Ngāpuhi to mean British European) began to deteriorate. Hōne Heke, a local Māori chief, identified the flagstaff flying the Union Jack above the bay at Kororāreka as the symbolic representation of the loss of control by the Ngāpuhi in the years following the signing of the Treaty. There are a number of causes of Heke's anger, such the fact that the capital of New Zealand had been moved from Okiato (Old Russell) to Auckland in 1841, and the colonial government had imposed customs duties on ships entering the Bay of Islands, these and other actions of the colonial government were viewed by Heke as reducing the trade between the Ngāpuhi with the foreigners. Traders in the Bay of Island also fermented trouble by saying that flag-staff, flying the Queen's flag, showed that the country [whenua] was gone to the Queen, and that the Ngāpuhi were no longer their own masters, but taurekareka (slaves) to Queen Victoria.

The flagstaff was cut down for the first time on 8 July 1844, by Te Haratua, an ally of Hone Heke. Heke had set out to cut down the flagstaff but had been persuaded by Archdeacon William Williams not to do so. The flagstaff was replaced and troops sent to guard the flagstaff. On 10 January 1845 the flagstaff was cut down a second time, on this occasion by Hone Heke. On 18 January 1845, a flagstaff sheathed in iron was erected. The next morning the flagstaff was cut down again by Hōne Heke. The next attack on the flagstaff by Hōne Heke was a much more serious incident, Hone Heke's warriors attacked the guard post, killing all the defenders and Heke cut down the flagstaff for the fourth time. At the same time, possibly as a diversion, Te Ruki Kawiti and his men attacked the town of Kororāreka. This was the beginning of what would be called the 'Flagstaff War' or the 'Northern War'. In 1846 Hone Heke and Te Ruki Kawiti agreed peace terms with the government. The British colonial government did not re-erect the flagstaff again, fearing to provoke further conflict.

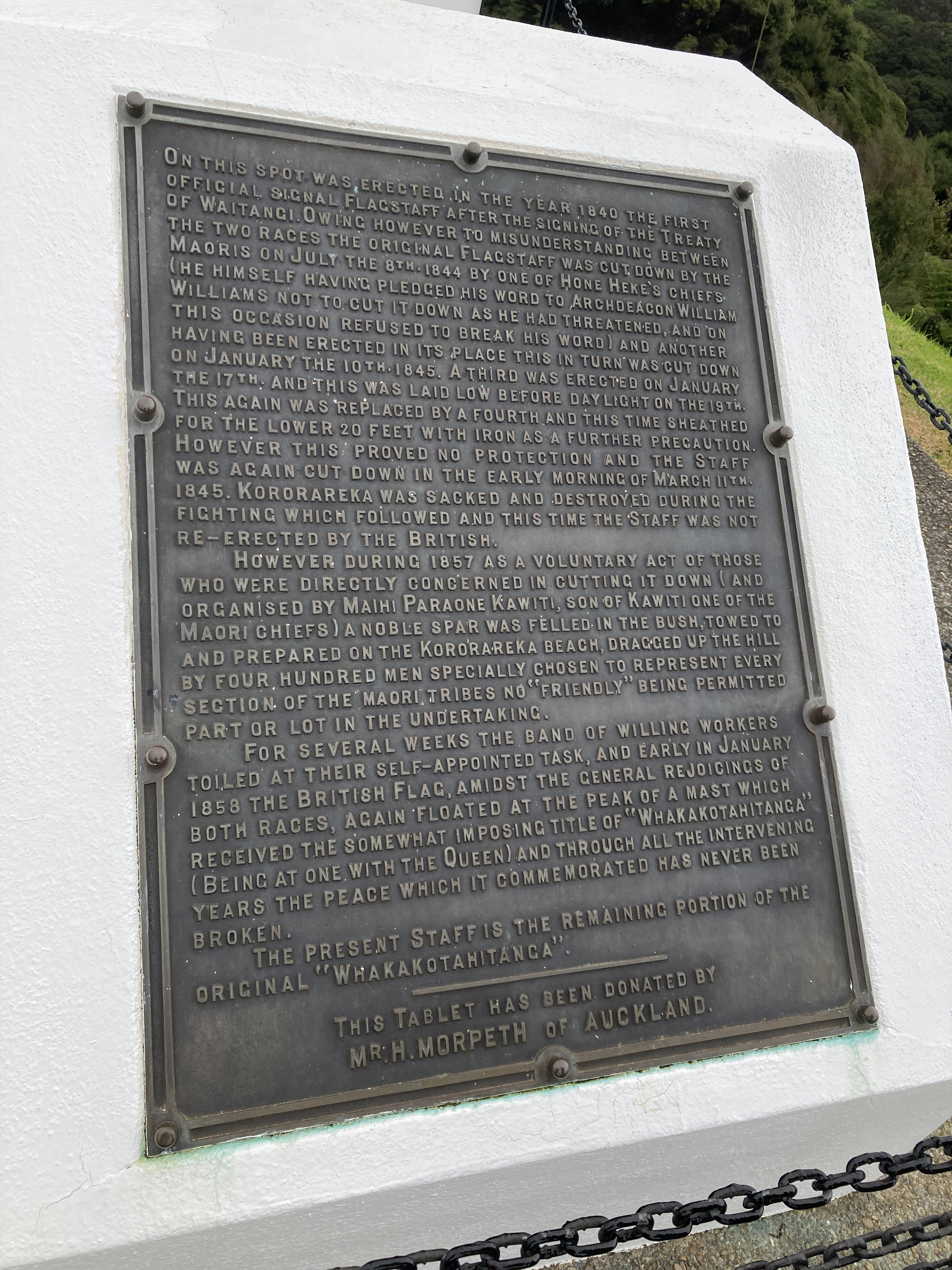
Plaque on flagstaff

The flagstaff that now stands at Kororāreka was erected in January 1858 at the direction of Kawiti's son Maihi Paraone Kawiti; with the flag being named Whakakotahitanga, “being at one with the Queen.” As a further symbolic act the 400 Ngāpuhi warriors involved in preparing and erecting the flagstaff were selected from the ‘rebel’ forces of Kawiti and Heke – that is, Ngāpuhi from the hapū of Tāmati Wāka Nene (who had fought as allies of the British forces during the Flagstaff War), observed, but did not participate in the erection of the fifth flagpole. The restoration of the flagpole was presented by Maihi Paraone Kawiti was a voluntary act on the part of the Ngāpuhi that had cut it down in 1845, and they would not allow any other to render any assistance in this work. The continuing symbolism of the fifth flagstaff at Kororāreka is that it exists because of the goodwill of the Ngāpuhi.

== Tourism ==
The hill is a favoured destination for many of the tourists coming to Russell, with walking tracks leading up the hill, which provides sweeping views over the bay. The bush around the hill is also kiwi territory, though the birds are too shy to be seen by passing wanderers.
