= Aperahama Taonui =

New Zealand tribal leader

Aperahama Taonui (died 23 September 1882) was a New Zealand tribal leader, prophet, historian, teacher and assessor. He was a leader of the Te Popoto hapū of the Ngāpuhi iwi. He was born in Whangaroa, Northland, probably in the 1810s. His father was Makoare Te Taonui.

== The Flagstaff War ==
Aperahama Taonui and his father supported Tāmati Wāka Nene in opposing Hōne Heke and Te Ruki Kawiti in the Flagstaff War (1845–46).

Aperahama Taonui received a bullet wound, probably in April 1845, in the early fighting near Okaihau. He was sent to Auckland to recuperate and there became friendly with Governor George Grey, who awarded Aperahama Taonui a government pension. His father, Makoare Te Taonui, led his warriors in the capture of Heke's pā at Te Ahuahu, which was followed by Nene's defeat of Heke in the Battle of Te Ahuahu on 12 June 1845 at Pukenui.
