= Okiato =

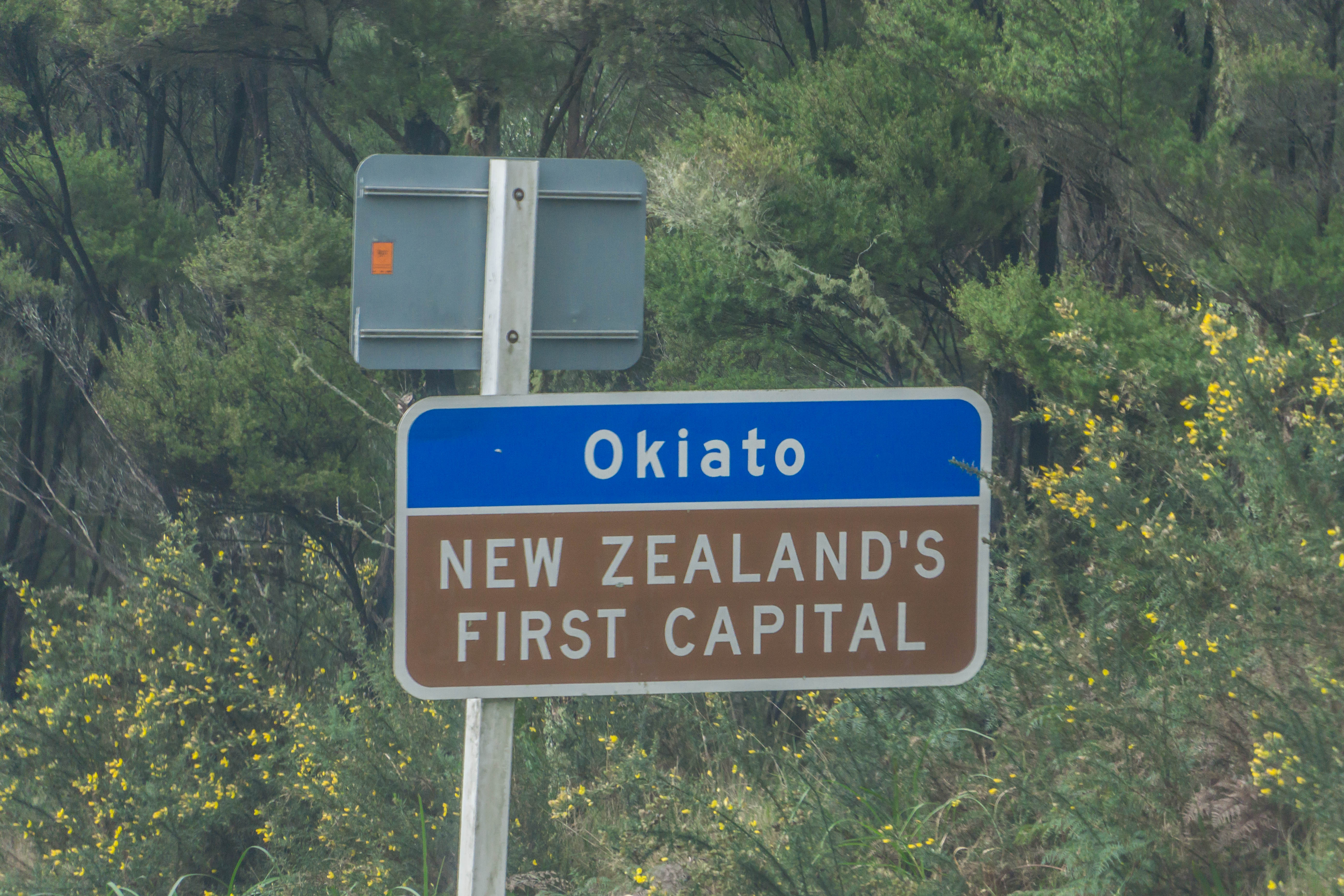
- New Zealand's First Capital
- Interactive map of Okiato
- Coordinates: 35.304°S 174.122°E
- Country: New Zealand
- Region: Northland Region
- District: Far North District
- Ward: Bay of Islands/Whangaroa
- Community: Bay of Islands-Whangaroa
- Subdivision: Russell-Ōpua
- Founded: 1840
- Electorates: Northland; Te Tai Tokerau

Government
  - Territorial Authority: Far North District Council
  - Regional council: Northland Regional Council
  - Mayor of Far North: Moko Tepania
  - Northland MP: Grant McCallum
  - Te Tai Tokerau MP: Mariameno Kapa-Kingi

Area
  - Total: 0.33 km^{2} (0.13 sq mi)

Population (June 2025)
  - Total: 200
  - Density: 610/km^{2} (1,600/sq mi)
- Postcode: 0272

Okiato or Old Russell is a small town in the Bay of Islands, New Zealand, 7 kilometres (4.3 mi) south of present-day Russell. It was founded in 1840 and served as New Zealand's first national capital until 1841, when the seat of government was moved to Auckland. The car ferry across the Bay of Islands, which provides the main access to Russell, runs between Okiato and Opua.

== History ==
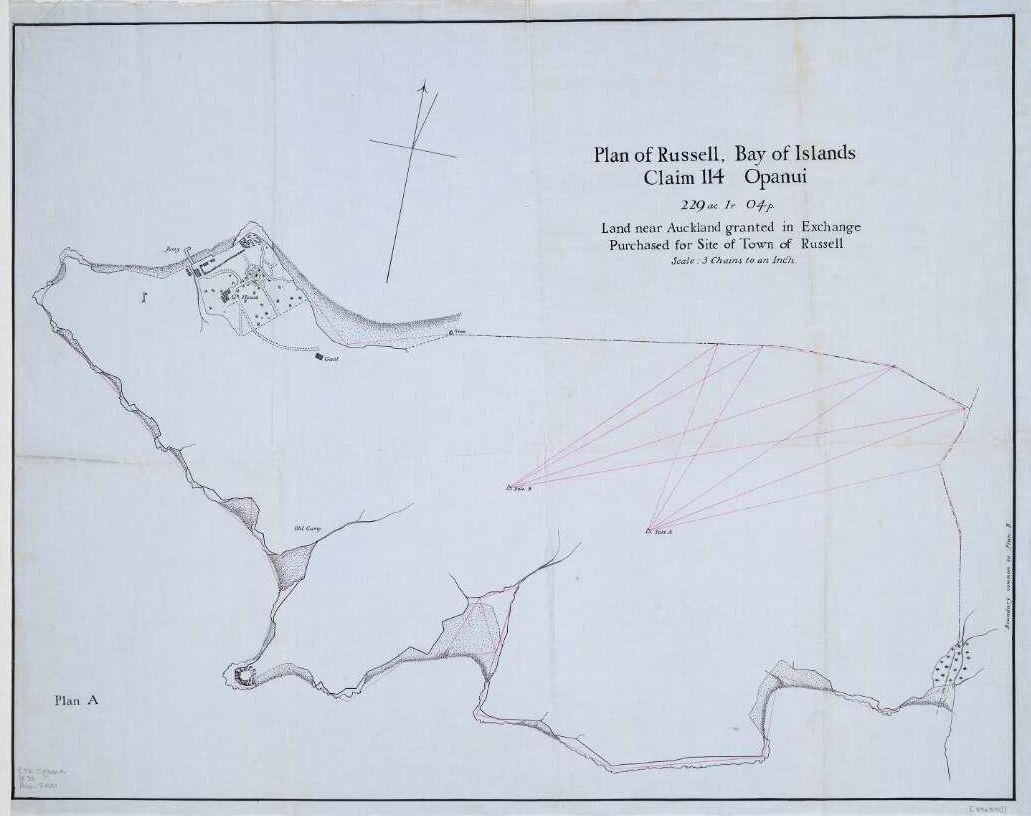
Plan of Russell (Okiato) in 1832

Pōmare II, the chief of the local Ngāti Manu Māori tribe (iwi) in the 1830s, sold land at Okiato to British merchant and ship owner Captain James Reddy Clendon, who settled there in 1832 and set up a trading station with partner Samuel Stephenson. Clendon became the first United States Consul for New Zealand in 1838 or 1839.

When the Treaty of Waitangi was signed in February 1840, Lieutenant-Governor William Hobson instructed the Surveyor-General, Felton Mathew, to report on possible locations for a capital in the Bay of Islands. Clendon's property met the requirements for a good anchorage and immediate availability of land suitable for subdivision and on-sale to settlers. Kororāreka (present-day Russell) was discounted as it had insufficient available land, and locations such as Paihia and Kerikeri were bypassed for various reasons. Clendon wanted 23,000 pounds for the 1.24 km^{2} of land, the house, two small cottages, a large store and other buildings. Hobson eventually secured it for 15,000 pounds. He changed its name from Okiato to Russell, in honour of the Secretary of State for the Colonies, Lord John Russell. Hobson and his family moved there in May 1840 and officials, troops, workmen and immigrants took up residence in permanent or temporary buildings and tents. Mathew drew up ambitious plans for a town, but only one of the intended roads was ever built – leading directly from the town hall to the town jail. A year later in 1841, New Zealand was established as a separate colony from New South Wales and Hobson moved the capital to Auckland. Subsequently, most of the Russell residents moved there too. A few officials lived on in the Government House at Russell but when it and the offices burned down in May 1842, they moved to Kororāreka leaving Russell virtually deserted.

Kororāreka was part of the Port of Russell and gradually became known as Russell also. In January 1844 Governor Robert FitzRoy officially designated Kororāreka as part of the township of Russell. Now the name Russell applies only to the erstwhile Kororāreka, while Okiato has resumed its original name.

== Demographics ==
Statistics New Zealand describes Ōkiato as a rural settlement. It covers 0.33 km^{2} (0.13 sq mi) and had an estimated population of 200 as of June 2025, with a population density of 606 people per km^{2}. The settlement is part of the larger Russell Peninsula statistical area.

Historical population
Year	Pop.	±% p.a.
2006	150	—
2013	168	+1.63%
2018	183	+1.73%
2023	198	+1.59%

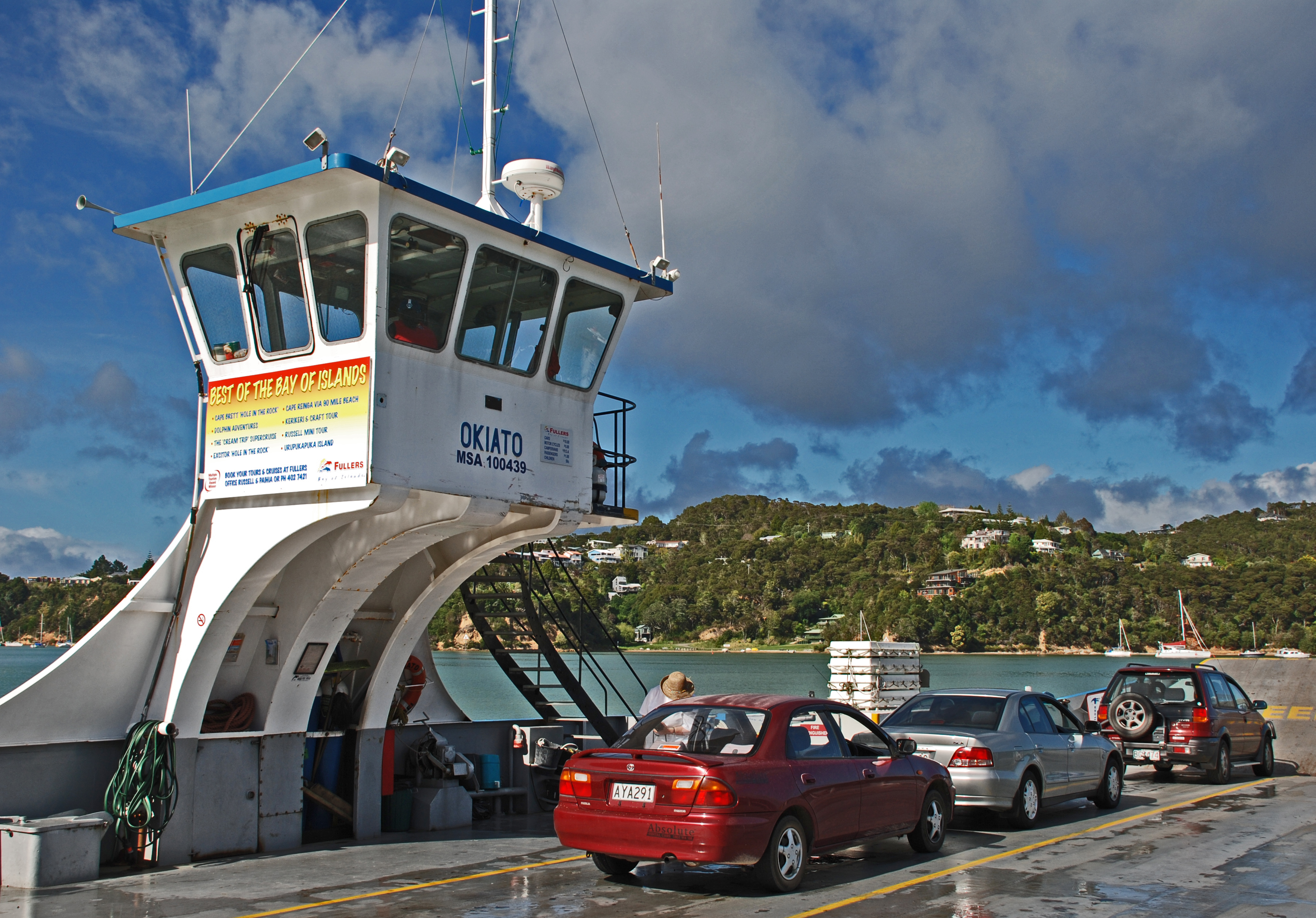
Car ferry between Opua and Okiato (with Opua in the distance)

Ōkiato had a population of 198 in the 2023 New Zealand census, an increase of 15 people (8.2%) since the 2018 census, and an increase of 30 people (17.9%) since the 2013 census. There were 102 males and 99 females in 96 dwellings. 4.5% of people identified as LGBTIQ+. The median age was 60.4 years (compared with 38.1 years nationally). There were 12 people (6.1%) aged under 15 years, 21 (10.6%) aged 15 to 29, 81 (40.9%) aged 30 to 64, and 84 (42.4%) aged 65 or older.

People could identify as more than one ethnicity. The results were 90.9% European (Pākehā), 12.1% Māori, 3.0% Pasifika, and 4.5% Asian. English was spoken by 98.5%, Māori language by 4.5%, and other languages by 10.6%. No language could be spoken by 1.5% (e.g. too young to talk). The percentage of people born overseas was 31.8, compared with 28.8% nationally.

Religious affiliations were 25.8% Christian, 1.5% New Age, and 4.5% other religions. People who answered that they had no religion were 62.1%, and 7.6% of people did not answer the census question.

Of those at least 15 years old, 36 (19.4%) people had a bachelor's or higher degree, 87 (46.8%) had a post-high school certificate or diploma, and 48 (25.8%) people exclusively held high school qualifications. The median income was $27,200, compared with $41,500 nationally. 9 people (4.8%) earned over $100,000 compared to 12.1% nationally. The employment status of those at least 15 was that 63 (33.9%) people were employed full-time, 30 (16.1%) were part-time, and 3 (1.6%) were unemployed.

=== Russell Peninsula statistical area ===
Russell Peninsula, which does not include the town of Russell, covers 26.17 km^{2} (10.10 sq mi). It had an estimated population of 710 as of June 2025, with a population density of 27 people per km^{2}.

Historical population
Year	Pop.	±% p.a.
2006	492	—
2013	525	+0.93%
2018	606	+2.91%
2023	705	+3.07%

Russell Peninsula had a population of 705 in the 2023 New Zealand census, an increase of 99 people (16.3%) since the 2018 census, and an increase of 180 people (34.3%) since the 2013 census. There were 363 males, 342 females and 3 people of other genders in 309 dwellings. 3.8% of people identified as LGBTIQ+. The median age was 59.9 years (compared with 38.1 years nationally). There were 57 people (8.1%) aged under 15 years, 60 (8.5%) aged 15 to 29, 309 (43.8%) aged 30 to 64, and 276 (39.1%) aged 65 or older.

People could identify as more than one ethnicity. The results were 89.8% European (Pākehā); 16.6% Māori; 1.3% Pasifika; 3.0% Asian; 0.9% Middle Eastern, Latin American and African New Zealanders (MELAA); and 3.0% other, which includes people giving their ethnicity as "New Zealander". English was spoken by 99.6%, Māori language by 3.4%, and other languages by 11.9%. No language could be spoken by 0.4% (e.g. too young to talk). The percentage of people born overseas was 32.3, compared with 28.8% nationally.

Religious affiliations were 22.1% Christian, 0.9% Māori religious beliefs, 0.4% Buddhist, 0.9% New Age, and 2.1% other religions. People who answered that they had no religion were 63.8%, and 10.2% of people did not answer the census question.

Of those at least 15 years old, 123 (19.0%) people had a bachelor's or higher degree, 318 (49.1%) had a post-high school certificate or diploma, and 159 (24.5%) people exclusively held high school qualifications. The median income was $29,400, compared with $41,500 nationally. 51 people (7.9%) earned over $100,000 compared to 12.1% nationally. The employment status of those at least 15 was that 219 (33.8%) people were employed full-time, 105 (16.2%) were part-time, and 6 (0.9%) were unemployed.
