= Pōmare II (Ngāpuhi) =

Māori leader (d. 1850)

Pōmare
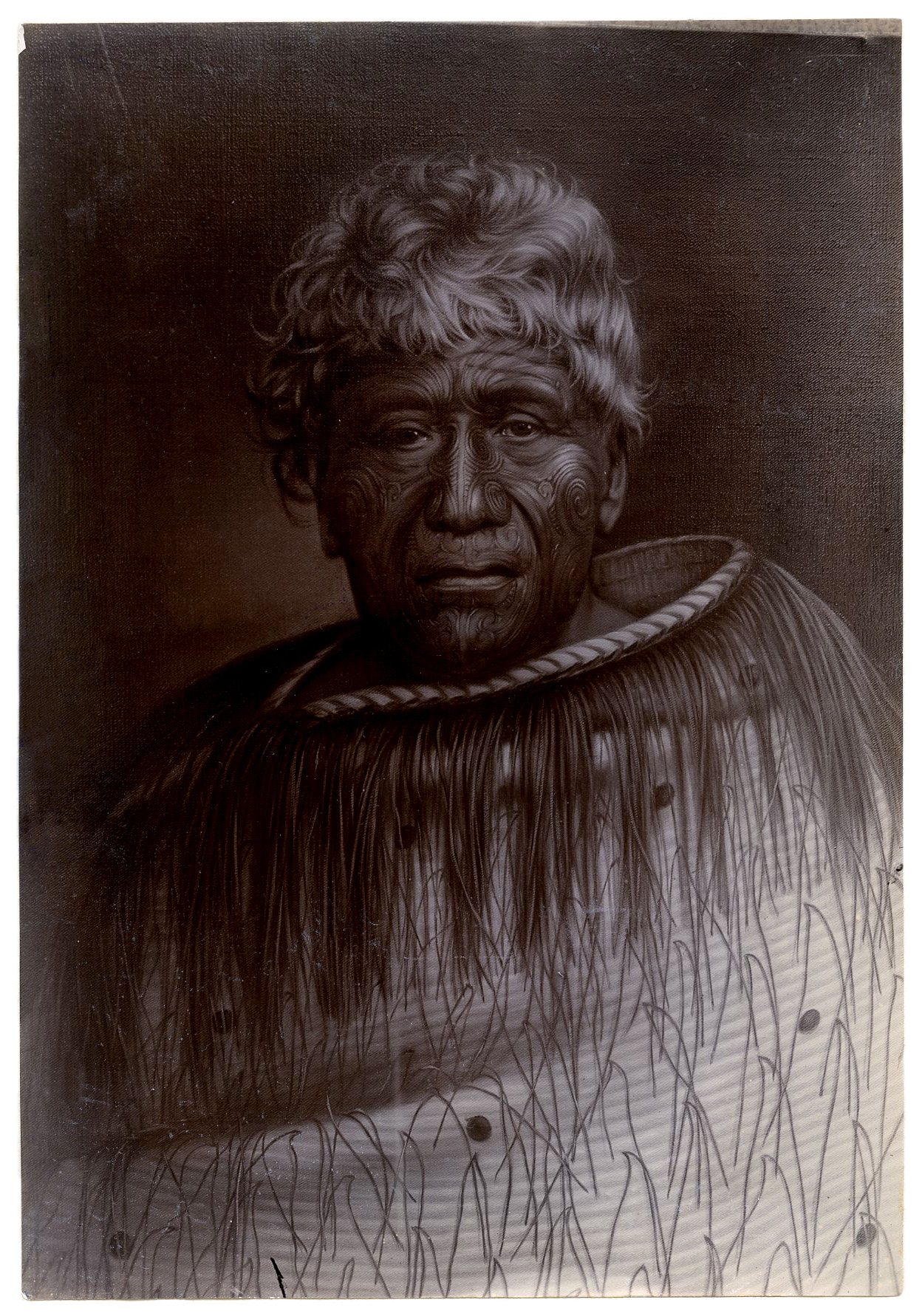
- A representation of Whētoi Pōmare; Artist: Gottfried Lindauer; Archives New Zealand
- Born: Whiria
- Died: 1850
- Other name: Pōmare II
- Children: Hāre Pōmare

Pōmare II (18th century – 1850), originally named Whiria, was a Māori rangatira (chief) of the Ngāpuhi iwi (tribe) in New Zealand and the leader of the Ngāti Manu hapū (subtribe) of the Ngāpuhi. He was the nephew of Pōmare I, his mother Haki being the elder sister of Pōmare I. When he succeeded his uncle as leader of the Ngāti Manu he took his uncle's names, Whētoi and Pōmare. He is referred to as Pōmare II, so as to distinguish him from his uncle.

== Early life ==
Whiria lived in the southern Bay of Islands. He was a member of Ngāti Manu through his mother Haki, who was the elder sister of Pōmare I, formerly called Whētoi. Whiria's father was Tautoro. Whiria was related to Te Whareumu of Ngāti Manu, who was the leading chief of Kororāreka (now the town of Russell). By 1815 Whiria was chief of a village in the Waikare area. Whiria's uncle Pōmare died in a raid in the Waikato in 1826, whereupon Whiria took his uncle's names of Pōmare and Whētoi. In 1828 Te Whareumu and Tiki, the only surviving son of Pōmare I, were both killed in a fight, and Pōmare II established himself as the principal chief of Ngāti Manu.

== Girls' War (1830) ==
In 1830, Pōmare II's position as the chief of Ngāti Manu was consolidated during the Girls' War, which is the name given to fighting on the beach at Kororāreka in March 1830 between northern and southern hapū of the Ngāpuhi. Pōmare II supported Kiwikiwi, the brother of Te Whareumu and chief of the Ngāti Manu hapū of Kororāreka, when northern hapū led by Ururoa (also known as Rewharewha), a chief of Whangaroa and brother-in-law of the late Hongi Hika, raided the kūmara gardens at Kororāreka on 5 March 1830. Ururoa was supported by other chiefs from the various northern hapū, including Hōne Heke and Rewa of the Ngāti Tāwake hapū of Kerikeri.

Henry Williams, William Williams and other members of the Church Missionary Society (CMS) came over the bay from Paihia to attempt to mediate an end to the fighting. The mediation efforts appeared promising, with the missionaries believing that the chiefs would accept that the plunder of the kūmara gardens at Kororāreka would suffice as satisfaction of the earlier insults to Pehi, the daughter of Hongi Hika, and Moewaka, the daughter of Rewa (the reason the battle is called the Girls’ War). However, further fighting occurred, which resulted in the death of Hengi, a chief of Whangaroa. Eventually Henry Williams persuaded the warriors to stop the fighting. Reverend Samuel Marsden had arrived on a visit and over the following weeks he and Henry Williams attempted to negotiate a settlement in which Kororāreka would be ceded by Pōmare II to Tītore as compensation for the death of Hengi, which was accepted by those engaged in the fighting.

== Events from the Girls' War to the Treaty of Waitangi ==
Pōmare II strengthened his pā at Ōtūihu, across from Opua, to make it impregnable against any attack by the northern hapū of the Ngāpuhi who now controlled Kororāreka and he also worked to promote trade with the Europeans, who were described by Samual Marsden as "generally men of the most infamous character: runaway convicts, and sailors, and publicans, who have opened grogshops in the pas, where riot, drunkenness, and prostitution are carried out daily". He quarreled with European settlors and seized their possessions as compensation. He seized Captain James Clendon's whaleboat in 1832. However, he was usually on friendly terms with Clendon. He also seized Thomas King's boat in 1833. The latter event led to the mediation of the dispute by Henry Williams and the intervention of James Busby, the British Resident, which resulted in HMS Alligator anchoring off Pōmare's pā at Ōtūihu.

He also fought a three-month war with Tītore in 1837, until a peace agreement was negotiated by Tāreha. Hōne Heke fought with Tītore against Pōmare II. An underlying cause of the fighting was a dispute as to the boundary line of the Kororāreka block that had been surrendered as a consequence of the death of Hengi some seven years previously in the Girls’ War.

Pōmare II signed the Treaty of Waitangi on 17 February 1840, and he also signed He Whakaputanga previously.

== Flagstaff War – attack on the pā of Pōmare II ==
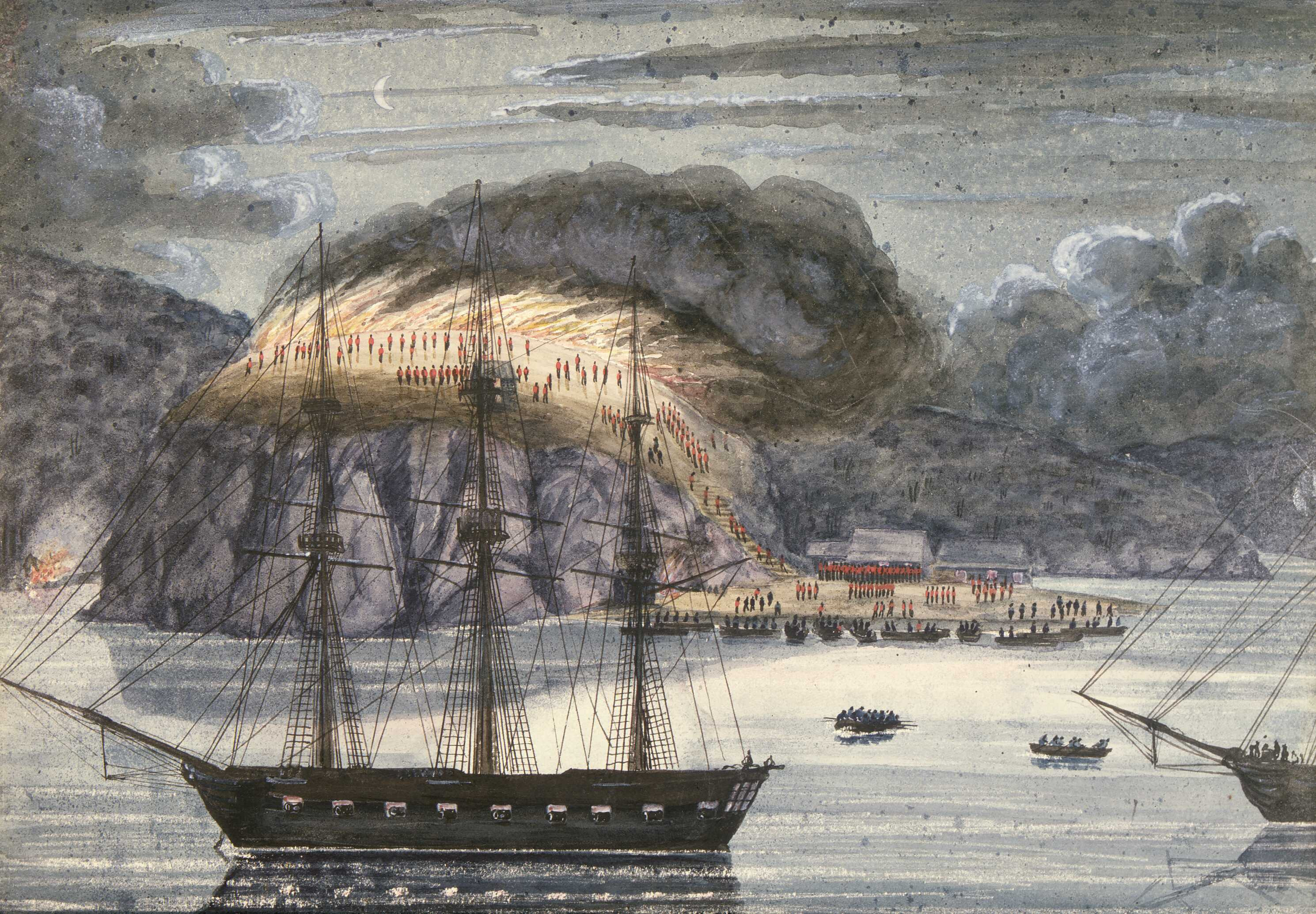
Lt Col Hulme burns Ōtūihu whilst Pōmare is held on board HMS North Star, 30 April 1845. Artist: John Williams, 58th Regt, 1845. Alexander Turnbull Library

Customs duties were put in place in 1841, which Hōne Heke and Pōmare II viewed as damaging the maritime trade from which they benefited – each levied visiting ships a fee to anchor in the Bay of Islands and the imposition of the customs duties resulted in whaling and sealing ships choosing to avoid the Bay of Islands. While Pōmare II had grievances as to the actions of the colonial government following the signing of the Treaty of Waitangi, he did not support Hōne Heke's actions in what is known as the Flagstaff War.

After the Battle of Kororāreka on 11 March 1845, when Hōne Heke and Te Ruki Kawiti and their warriors sacked Kororāreka and Heke cut down the flagstaff, the colonial government attempted to re-establish its authority. On 28 April 1845, troops, under the command of Lieutenant Colonel William Hulme, arrived in the Bay of Islands. The following day the military forces advanced on Pōmare's pā, notwithstanding Pōmare's position of neutrality. Letters of a treasonous nature from Pōmare to Pōtatau Te Wherowhero, intercepted, were said to have been the reason for targeting Pōmare.

The military forces advanced up to Pōmare's pā and a tense armed standoff. Pōmare acquiesced to requests to come to Hulme, who promptly took him prisoner. Tricked, Pōmare then ordered his warriors not to resist and his people escaped into the surrounding bush. He was taken on board HMS North Star. This left the military forces open to enter, loot and burn the pā. This action caused considerable puzzlement since up until that time Pōmare had been considered neutral, by himself and almost everyone else. The military forces also burnt two pubs or grog shops which Pōmare had established within his pā to encourage the Pākehā settlers, sailors, whalers etc. to visit and trade with him. North Star moved on to Auckland.

He was released after the intervention of Tāmati Wāka Nene and he was paid compensation. He remained neutral in the conflict between Hōne Heke and Te Ruki Kawiti against the colonial forces and their Ngāpuhi allies, who were led by Tāmati Wāka Nene.

== Legacy ==
Pōmare II became a Christian. He died in July or August 1850.

Hāre Pōmare (?–1864) was the son of Pōmare II.
