= Makoare Te Taonui =

Māori chief (c. 1790 – 1862)

- Rangatira of Te Popoto
- Tenure: 1828 – 1862
- Predecessor: Muriwai
- Born: Te Taonui c. 1790
- Died: 20 September 1862; Utakura, Hokianga
- Buried: Williams Memorial Church, Paihia
- Wars and battles: Flagstaff War: Battle of Ruapekapeka
- Spouses: Katuku; Hinuata

Makoare Te Taonui (born Te Taonui; c. 1790 – 20 September 1862) was a Māori rangatira (chief) of Te Popoto, a hapū within Ngāpuhi.

== Biography ==
Makoare Te Taonui was born as Te Taonui, into the Te Popoto hapū of the Ngāpuhi iwi. He was the son of Hautai and grandson Te Aokaitū. He had an older brother called Muriwai, a prominent Te Popoto chief, and another brother called Te Huru. After Muriwai's death in early 1828, Te Taonui become the hapū's chief. He had two wives, Katuku, and Hinuata of Ngāti Rēhia, with whom he had a son, Tautoru, who would later be known as Aperahama Taonui. According to some accounts, his father-in-law was Te Wharemaru and his brother-in-law was Haimona Pita Matangi.

In September 1819, Te Taonui met the missionary Samuel Marsden at Utakura, inland from the Hokianga Harbour, whoee pronounced him "a very well informed man." In March 1820, Marsden returned and Te Taonui accompanied him on the HMS Dromedary. Te Taonui also visited Sydney, where he was thought to have worked his passage on the brig Governor Macquarie. His baptismal name, Makoare, was a transliteration of Macquarie.

On 12 February 1840, Taonui signed the Waitangi sheet of the Treaty of Waitangi. He was originally opposed to the Treaty, with him reportedly saying: "We are not … willing to give up our land. It is from the earth we obtain all things. The land is our Father; the land is our chieftainship; we will not give it up." However, after a confrontation with Governor William Hobson and early settler Frederick Maning, his stance on the Treaty softened and he began to jointly chant a song of welcome alongside chiefs Tāmati Wāka Nene, Eruera Maihi Patuone, and Rangatira Moetara, to Hobson.

During the Flagstaff War, Makoare Te Taonui fought alongside the British and Tāmati Wāka Nene against Hōne Heke. Throughout the war, Taonui and his tribe fought with distinction; his brother Te Huru was killed and his son Aperahama was severely wounded. When British troops arrived to fight against Heke, Nene went to welcome them at Russell and Taonui was left to contain the rebels at Lake Ōmāpere. At the Battle of Ruapekapeka, Taonui was given an independent command by Governor George Grey and was sent to Hikurangi with a contingent of 400 men in an effort to stop Heke from joining forces with Te Ruki Kawiti.

Makoare Te Taonui died on 20 September 1862 at Utakura. He was buried at Williams Memorial Church, Paihia.
