= Cyprian Bridge (British Army officer) =

British Army officer

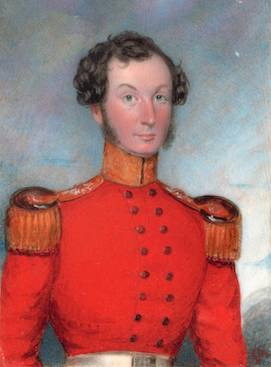
- Major Cyprian Bridge, 58th Regiment
- Born: 7 June 1807; Amherstburg, Essex County, Ontario, Canada
- Died: 9 July 1885 (aged 78); 8 Lansdown Place, Cheltenham, Gloucestershire, England
- Burial place: St Peter's Church, Leckhampton, Cheltenham
- Spouse(s): Sophia Anne Walker (m. 1833–1842) Louisa Mary Bowen (m. 1843–1860) Mary Louisa Williamson (m. 1862)
- Relatives: Cyprian Bridge (nephew)
- Military career
- Allegiance: United Kingdom
- Branch: (United Kingdom of Great Britain and Ireland) British Army
- Service years: 1825–1860
- Rank: Brevet Colonel
- Unit: 58th (Rutlandshire) Regiment of Foot
- Commands: 58th (Rutlandshire) Regiment of Foot
- Campaigns: New Zealand Wars; Flagstaff War; Ōtūihu, 1845; Puketutu, 1845; Waikare, 1845; Ōhaeawai, 1845; Ruapekapeka, 1846
- Awards: New Zealand War Medal
- Other work: Commission of the Peace for the Colony of New Zealand, 1846– Commission of the Peace for the Province of New Ulster, Russell, 1848– Resident Magistrate, Russell, Bay of Islands, 1848– Deputy Registrar of Births, Deaths and Marriages, Russell, Bay of Islands, 1848–

Colonel Cyprian Bridge (7 June 1807 – 9 July 1885) was an officer of the 58th Regiment of Foot, British Army, and war artist.

== Early years and family ==
Cyprian Bridge was born at Amherstburg, Essex County, Ontario, Canada, on 7 June 1807, the eldest son of Cyprian Bridge (1784–1844) and Elizabeth Powell Goddard (1788–1876) of Rotherhithe, Surrey, England, then living in Quebec. His army statement of services, though, records that he was born on 7 June 1808. He was baptised at Saint John's Anglican church, Windsor, Ontario, on 4 July 1807.

His father, a Royal Artillery officer, later participating in the War of 1812 at Fort Niagara and in the Niagara Frontier campaign of 1813, was to be wounded and mentioned in despatches.

== Career ==
Bridge received a commission as an ensign in the 58th (Rutlandshire) Regiment of Foot by purchase on 8 April 1825 and advanced to rank of lieutenant by purchase on 31 January 1828.

Stationed with the 58th Regiment in Ceylon from 30 December 1828 to 31 December 1829, he had returned by 1833. There he married Sophia Anne Walker of Cawnpore, West Bengal, India, at St. Peter's Church, Colombo, on 18 May 1833, and advanced to rank of captain by purchase on 16 December 1836. Sophia gave birth to five children in Ceylon, all of whom died soon after; Cyprian Henry Bridge living longest from 1838 to 1841. Twin daughters—Selina Adelaide and Maria Victoria—born on Her Majesty's Birthday 1839, on board troopship HMS Apollo returning from Ceylon to England, died in June and July 1840. Sophia followed her children on 29 April 1842, at home—10 Promenade Terrace, Cheltenham—aged 32.

Bridge advanced to rank of major by purchase on 30 December 1842 and married Louisa Mary Bowen, a daughter of Major General Herbert Bowen, CB, Bengal Army, at St Mary's Church, Marylebone, London, on 1 August 1843. His next overseas posting was Australia. The barque Pestonjee Bomanjee carrying the 58th Regiment under his and Captain Charles Lavallin Nugent's command, left Chatham on 14 May and Deal on 17 May 1844, for Sydney, New South Wales.

=== Australia and New Zealand ===
Pestonjee Bomanjee landed Bridge, Nugent, 146 rank & file, 10 sergeants, 13 women and 27 children of the 58th Regiment, at Hobart, Van Diemen's Land, in September 1844. Having moved on to Sydney, and with continued troubles in New Zealand, Bridge set out for Auckland with 200 troops on board the Slains Castle, landing there on 21 April 1845.

==== Flagstaff War ====
With a view to re-establishing order in the Bay of Islands, an expedition of HMS North Star under Captain Sir James Everard Home with 470 officers and men under Lieutenant Colonel William Hulme, 96th Regiment, Major Bridge, 58th Regiment, and about 50 Kororareka volunteers, under Cornthwaite Hector, set out for the bay in the Slains Castle, the Velocity, and the schooner Aurora, on 23 and 26 April. In the afternoon of 27 April, several boats of the 58th Regiment landed on Kororareka beach, the Union Jack was hoisted under a Royal Salute from HMS North Star and martial law proclaimed, after which, the troops returned to the ships.

===== Ōtūihu =====
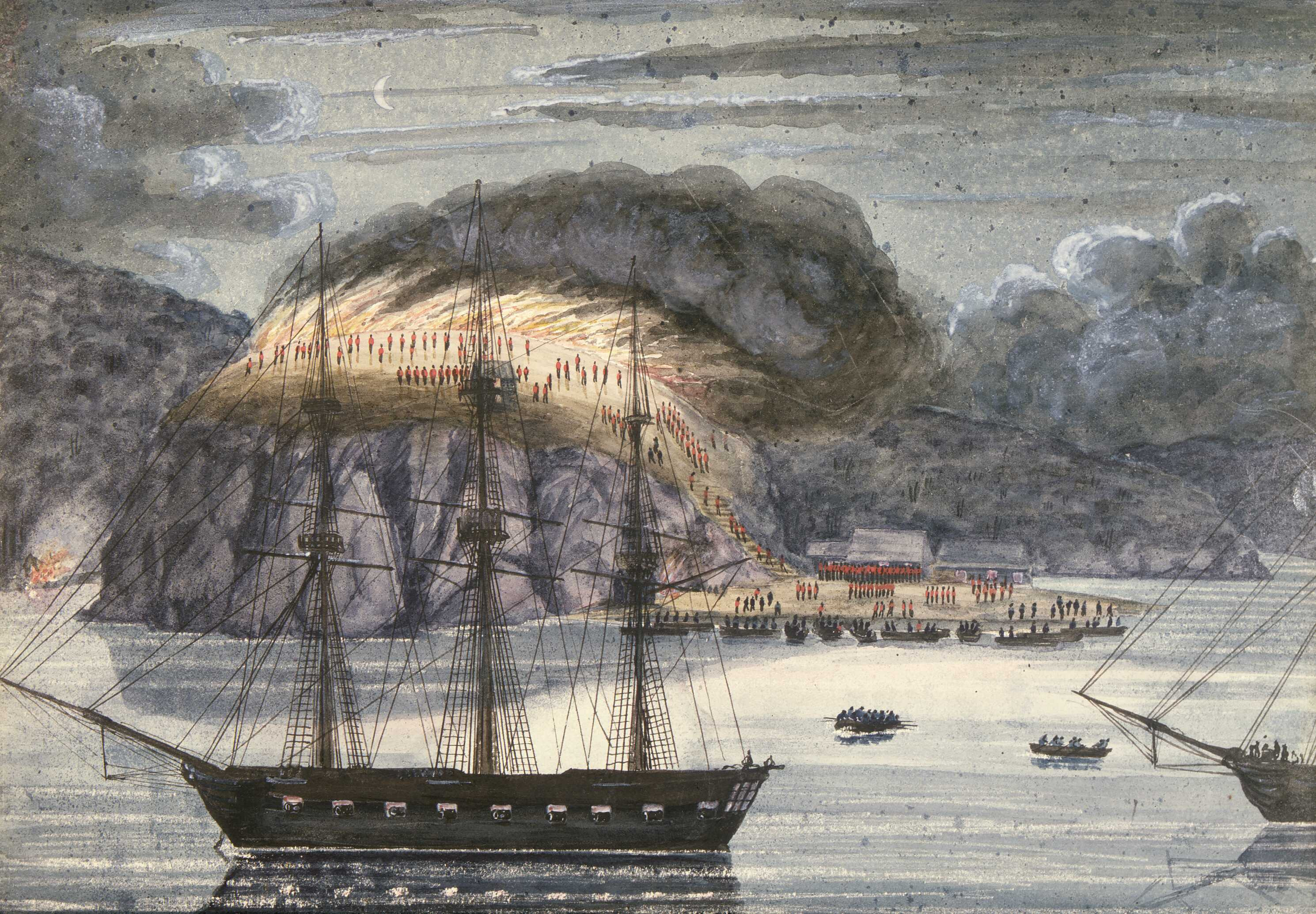
Lt Col Hulme burns Otuihu whilst Pōmare is held on board HMS North Star, 30 April 1845. Artist: John Williams, Sergeant, 58th Regt, 1845 Alexander Turnbull Library

Bridge accompanied Lieutenant Colonel William Hulme's expedition to Ōtūihu pā on 30 April. Following a tense stand-off between the Pōmare's warriors and detachments of the 58th and 96th Regiments, Hulme persuaded Pōmare to meet in person, took him prisoner on board HMS North Star and burnt the pā.

Bridge's watercolour of the incident shows HMS North Star and the brigantine Velocity firing their guns firing towards opposing fire at Ōtūihu's landing; Velocity approaching the landing accompanied by nine boats of soldiers. Sergeant John Williams's watercolour shows the soldiers burning of the pā.

===== Puketutu =====
Following Ōtūihu, Hulme intended to march on Kawiti's pā at Waiōmio but abandoned that expedition on contradictory reports of the terrain. Upon Paratine Rekeao's (Paratene Kekeao) insistence, he turned his attention to Hōne Heke's Te Kahika pā at Puketutu, Lake Ōmāpere, and having planned the expedition with Tāmati Wāka Nene, marched the troops some 22.5 miles inland, in bad weather, from their landing at Onewhero Bay (Rutland Bay to the 58th), via Kerikeri, to camp at Ōkaihau, between 3 and 7 May.

Hulme and Bridge inspected Heke's purpose built fighting pā from a hill about a mile away on 7 May, and found it to be a formidable trebly stockaded fortification clad in musket-proof flax, with traverses, loopholes and deep ditch. During the siege, Bridge commanded the reserve with want of assignment. However, the 58th taking part in the action suffered a significant proportion of casualties—8 of the 13 killed and 17 of the 39 variously wounded. Lacking the artillery necessary to achieve the immediate and preferred conclusion, Hulme abandoned the siege. Furthermore, bad accommodation, mounting casualties, insufficient nourishment and a possible outbreak of illness, led to breaking camp at Ōkaihau and the return to Kerikeri on 10 May.

Bridge's watercolours depict the pā under siege flying a Red Ensign and red triangular pennant, with the navy's Congreve rocket crew, Bridge's reserve, Nene's contingent, the line of soldiers on high ground firing on the pā and Hulme's engagement in the distant hill.

===== Waikare =====
Bridge led the attack on the Kapotai pā, up the Waikare inlet, with 200 men, on 15–16 May. The pā, an ordinary type, put up little resistance and was destroyed. The troops, on arriving at Kawakawa after the event, withdrew from the field and re-embarked for Auckland.

Bridge's watercolours of the expedition depict the morning landing of troops from small boats and the attack on and burning of the pā.

===== Ōhaeawai =====
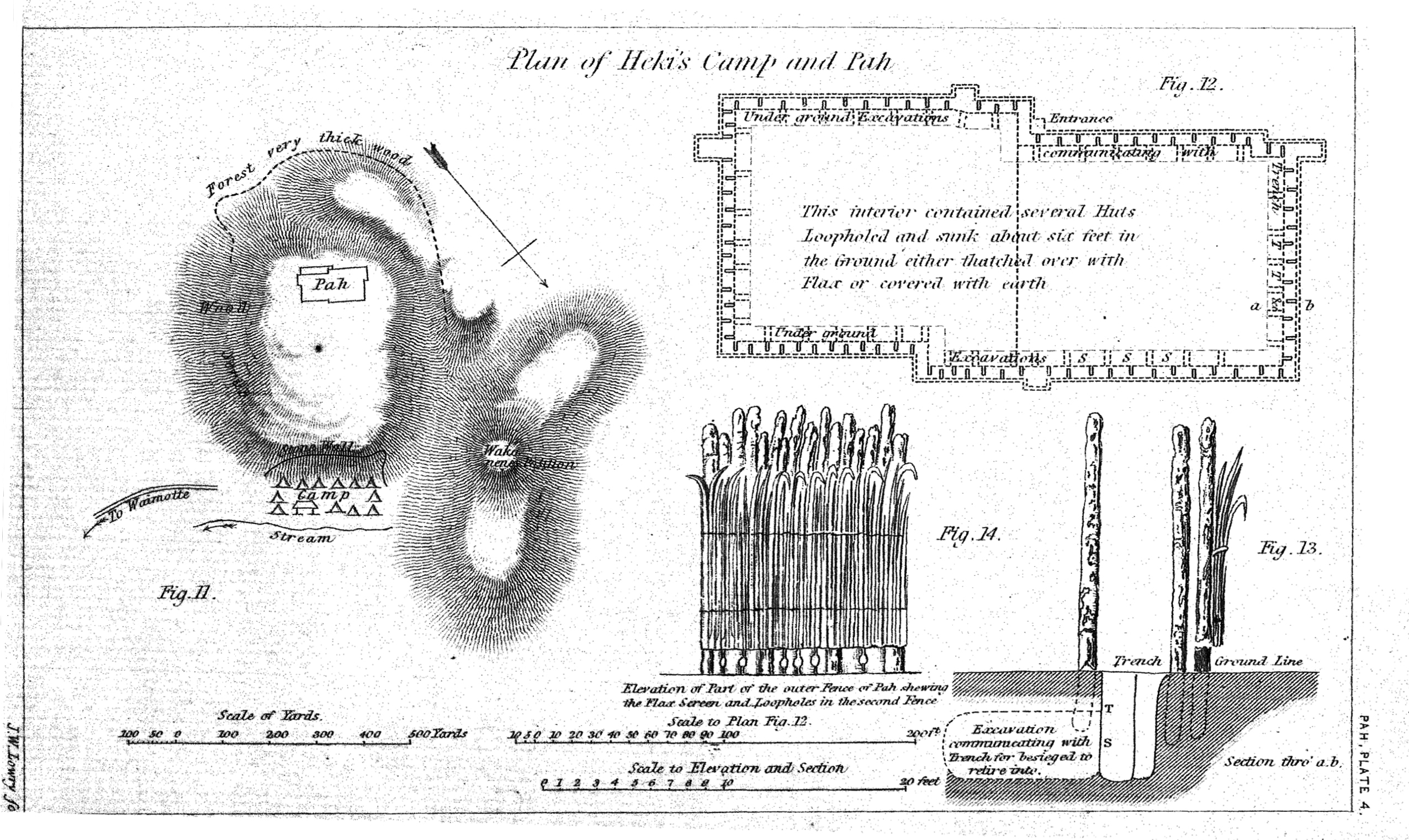
Plan of Ōhaeawai pā

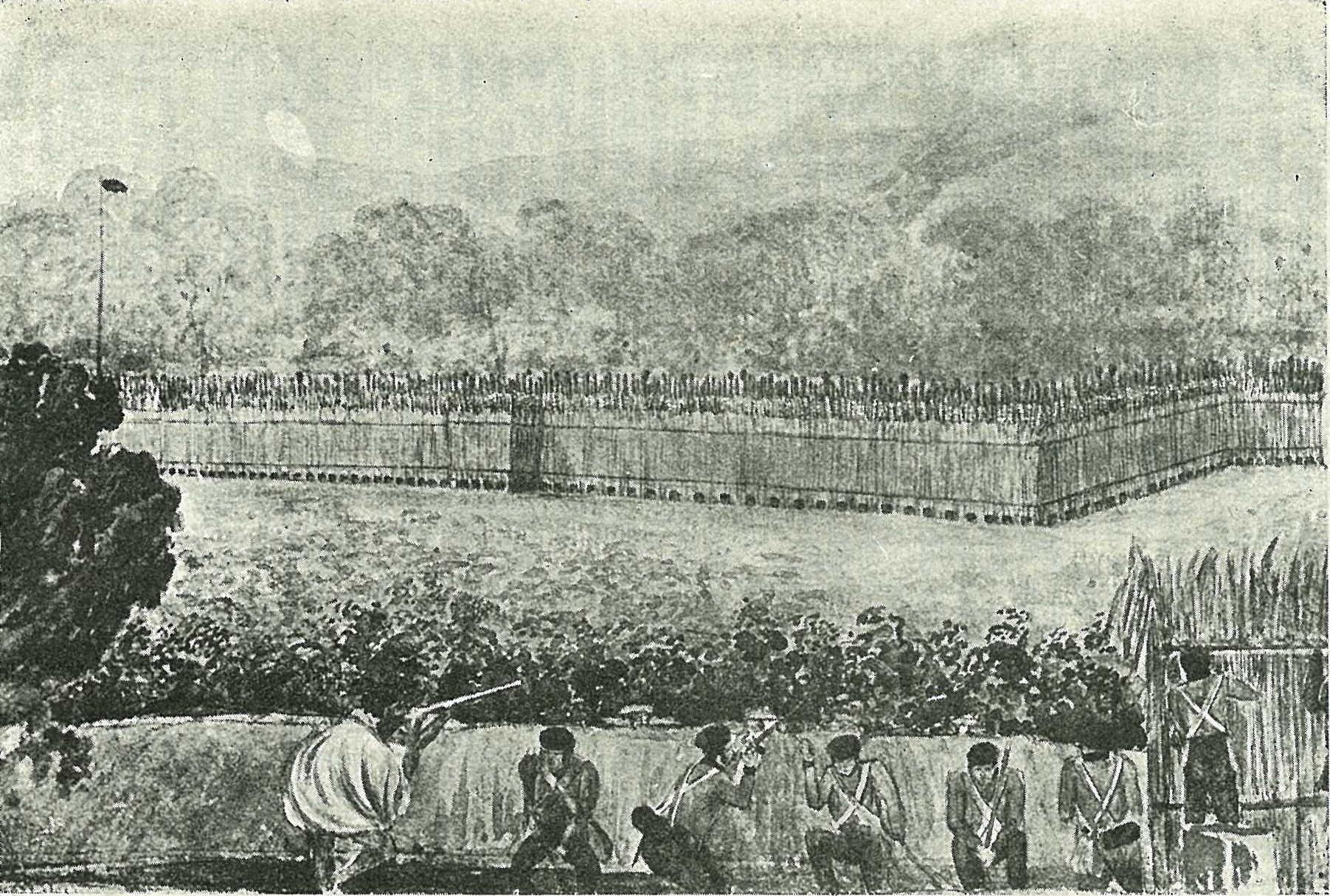
Ōhaeawai pā from the British breastwork, 1 July 1845. Artist: Cyprian Bridge, Major, 58th Regt.

During the Battle of Ōhaeawai, on 1 July, Bridge led the storming party to retake Wāka's Hill and artillery overlooking Ōhaeawai pā. Sergeant John Williams's watercolour records Bridge and his men ascending Wāka's Hill to retake the battery.

Bridge's paintings show the sides of the pā as viewed from behind the British breastwork adjoining the right battery, and the storming of Ōhaeawai as observed from the top of Wāka's Hill.

===== Waimate =====
In August, a rumour had been circulating, brought to Wellington by a Waikato man, that an attack by Heke and Kawiti on the Waimate military camp had resulted in the death of Bridge, many soldiers, Kawiti and many warriors. In this frightening scenario, the Rev. Henry Williams and Mr Clarke were also said to have been shot, and Nene had made peace with Heke, uniting their forces. As no further hostilities had taken place since Despard's siege of Ōhaeawai, the rumour soon proved false.

Whilst at Waimate, Bridge's painted an idyllic country scene of fenced fields, cattle, a distant hill with rift feature, Te Waimate Mission houses, St John the Baptist Church and Te Ahuahu volcanic cone in the distant right. It was later published as engraving.

Bridge had extensive earthworks built at the military camp and mission, only for Despard to order them to be levelled when he returned in September: "I could never admit that a European force of between 300 and 400 men, well supplied with arms and ammunition and four pieces of cannon, required any rampart to defend them in an open country against a barbarian enemy."

By November the whole military force had abandoned Waimate for the ruins of Kororareka and the next step of the campaign. Seemingly, it was proposed that strong fortifications be built there to protect the flagstaff.

===== Ruapekapeka =====
By December a reinforced British force was again on the move, this time building a long road to besiege Kawiti's Ruapekapeka pā.

==== Peace ====
A son, Cyprian Wynyard Bridge, named after Lieutenant Colonel Robert Henry Wynyard, 58th Regiment, was born on 17 January 1846, at Government House, Auckland.

On 6 February 1846 Bridge was appointed to the Commission of the Peace for the Colony of New Zealand. A daughter was born in Auckland on 29 August 1847. He was Resident Magistrate at Russell from October 1847, appointed to the Commission of the Peace for the province of New Ulster, Bay of Islands, and Deputy Registrar of Births, Deaths and Marriages for the District of Russell in early 1848. Whilst Resident Magistrate at the Bay of islands, a son, Herbert Bowen Bridge, was born at Wahapu cantonment on 31 July 1849.

Back in Auckland in January 1850, Bridge was appointed to the management committee organising the Auckland Regatta in commemoration of the tenth anniversary of the colony, to be held on 29 January 1850; a combination of Auckland Anniversary Day of 29 January 1842, and the Treaty of Waitangi of 6 February 1840. He had several entries in the matches—Panewa, manned by soldiers of the 58th, in the third match for whale boats, and Sylph in the fourth match for sailing boats under 4 tons. Panewa won its match ahead of three other contestants.

==== Homeward bound ====
Bridge and family sold up their Princes Street residence in October 1850 and cleared out of Auckland and New Zealand for London on the Fairy Queen on 25 October.

=== Britain and Ireland ===
Back home he took command of the 58th's depot companies at Chatham, Kent, moving on to Canterbury, where another daughter was born on 6 May 1851, and to Jersey in 1852. He was promoted to Brevet Lieutenant Colonel on 20 June 1854.

In April 1856, Bridge and regiment's depot companies, moved from the Linenhall barracks, Dublin, to Kilkenny to receive the service companies returning from New Zealand. He had four companies of there under his command in May 1856. His promotion to Lieutenant Colonel without purchase was gazetted on 9 November 1858, and, within the week, Brevet Colonel on 14 November 1858.

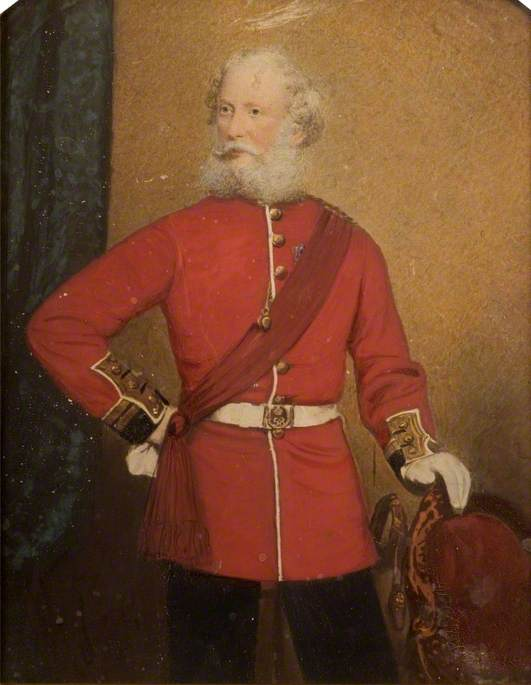
Lieutenant Colonel Cyprian Bridge, Commander of 58th Regiment, c. 1860. Northampton Museum and Art Gallery

Bridge retired from the army in November 1860, upon which the officers held a dinner in his honour, being the thirty-sixth anniversary of his joining the regiment, and presented a gift—a massive silver inkstand representing the regimental castle and key badge, with the inscription: Presented by Lieut.-Colonel C. Hood and the Officers of the 58th Regiment to Colonel Cyprian Bridge, on his retiring from the regiment, in which he served with honour 35 years.—22 November 1860. Family gifted the inkstand and other memorabilia to Auckland War Memorial Museum in 1986.

His wife, Louisa Mary, had died at Boulogne-sur-Mer, Pas-de-Calais, France, on 31 July 1860. During the 1861 United Kingdom census, he resided with headquarters at Sheffield Barracks, Nether Hallam, Sheffield, South Yorkshire.

==== Queen's and Regimental Colours ====
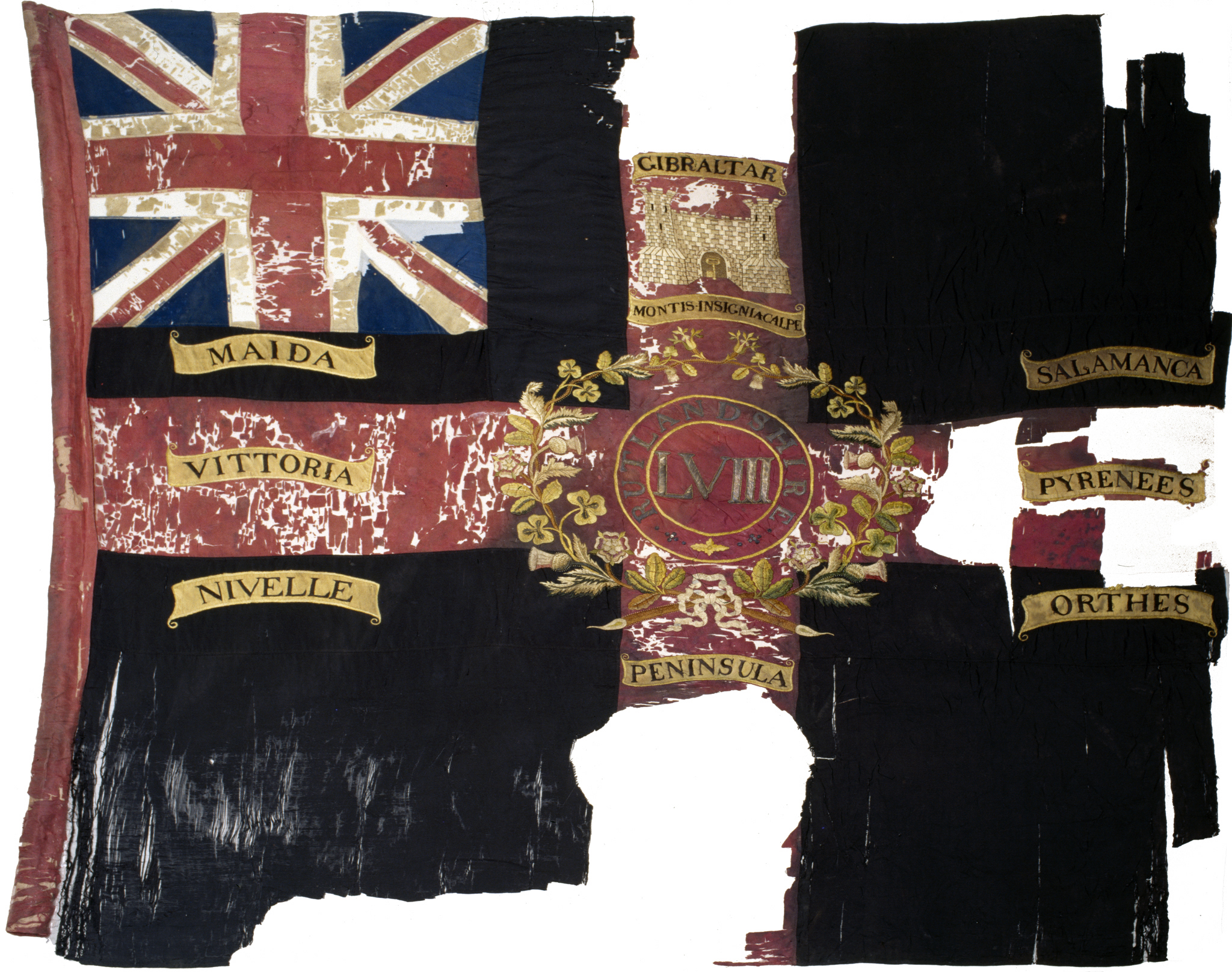
The Colours of the 58th Regiment presented to Auckland by Colonel Bridge and the officers. Auckland Museum

The Queen's and Regimental Colours of the 58th (Rutlandshire) Regiment of Foot, the first regimental colours unfurled in New Zealand, had been presented to the Regiment on Bruntsfield Links, Edinburgh, by Lady Greenock, the wife of General Charles Cathcart, then Commander in Chief, Scotland, on 9 July 1841.

Before Bridge left the regiment, and on presentation of new 58th Regiment colours at Aldershot Camp in May 1860, he arranged for the old colours to be sent out to New Zealand, to Lieutenant Colonel Henry Balneavis, for presentation to Auckland and deposit in St Paul's Church. However, the Bishop declined the colours in the Church on public grounds. Whist considering Bridge's suggestion to return them home or the eventual display in another Auckland public building, the colours were moved from the Queen's Warehouse on Queen Street Wharf and placed in temporary roof storage at Government House, then to the care of Balneavis in 1865 who, with Captain Tighe, placed the colours on display in the newly built Supreme Court in 1868, with the approval of Colonel Charles Hood and officers and 58th Regiment then in Bengal. The colours were handed over to the custody of the Auckland War Memorial Museum authorities on 13 November 1932. The 58th were the last British Army regiment to carry regimental colours into battle—First Boer War, Battle of Laing's Nek, January 1881.

== Later life ==
On 22 January 1862, Bridge married Mary Louisa Williamson, daughter of the late Jonathan Williamson of Lakelands, County Dublin, at St James's Church, Paddington, Hyde Park, London. In 1871 they lived at 8 Lansdown Place, Cheltenham. His father, Lieutenant Colonel Cyprian Bridge, RA, died on 4 January 1872 at 10 Promenade Terrace, Cheltenham, England. Several sons returned to settle in New Zealand—Cyprian Wynyard Bridge and Herbert Bowen Bridge.

Bridge died at home, 8 Lansdown Place, Cheltenham, on 9 July 1885 and was buried at St Peter's Church, Leckhampton, on 13 July.

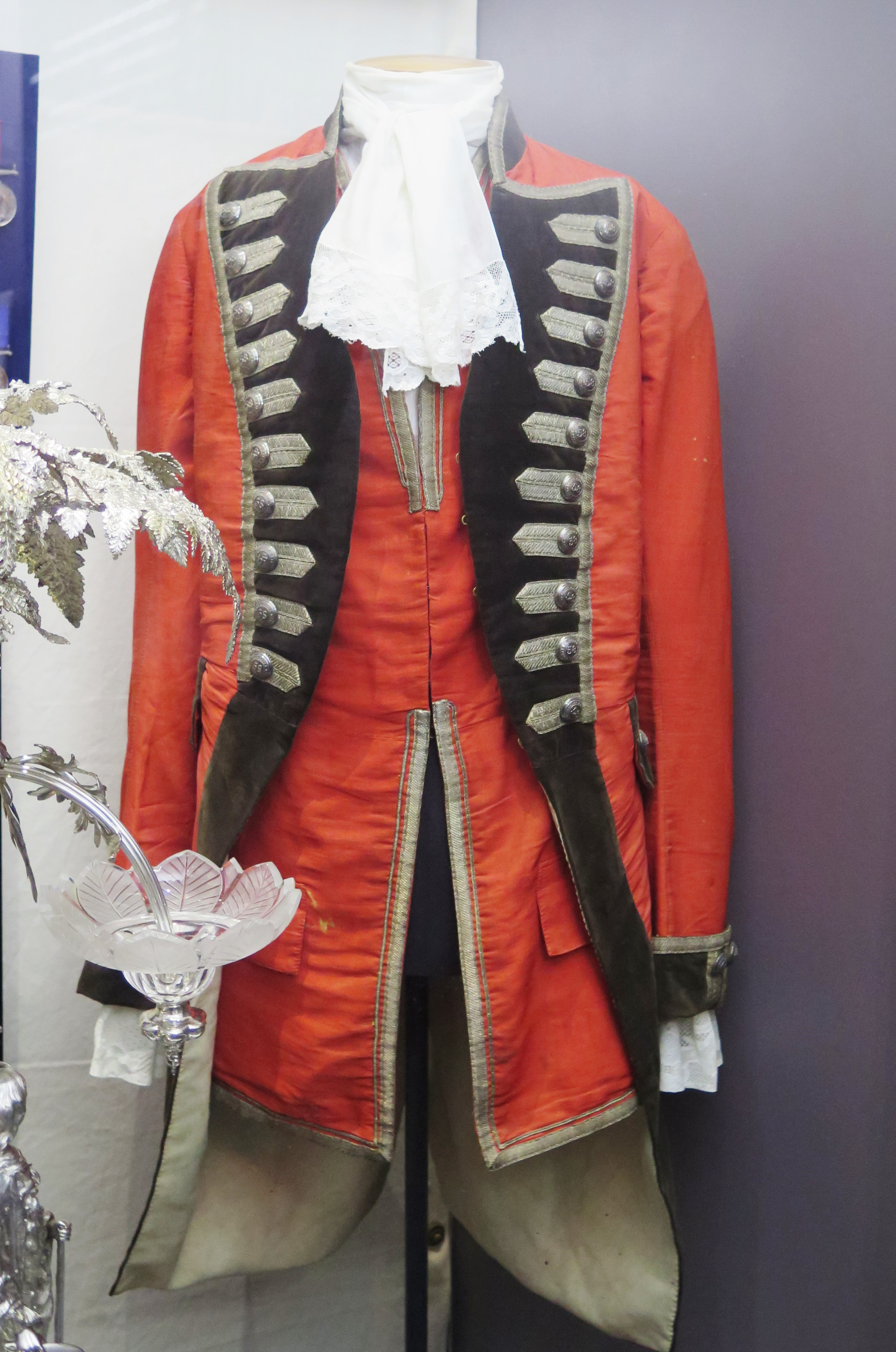
58th Regt mess dress belonging to Cyprian Bridge.
Auckland Museum

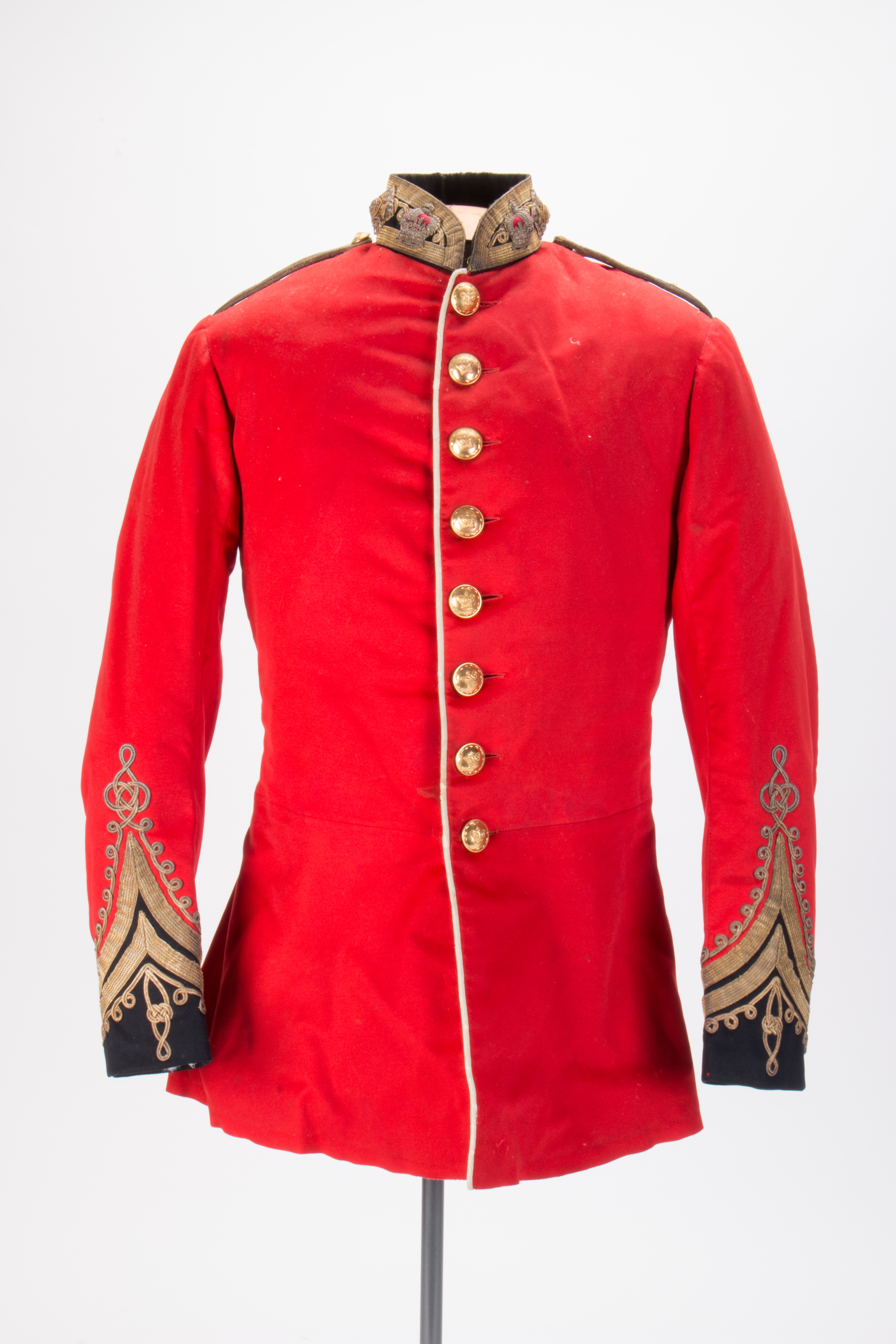
58th Regt tunic worn by Col Cyprian Bridge.
Auckland Museum

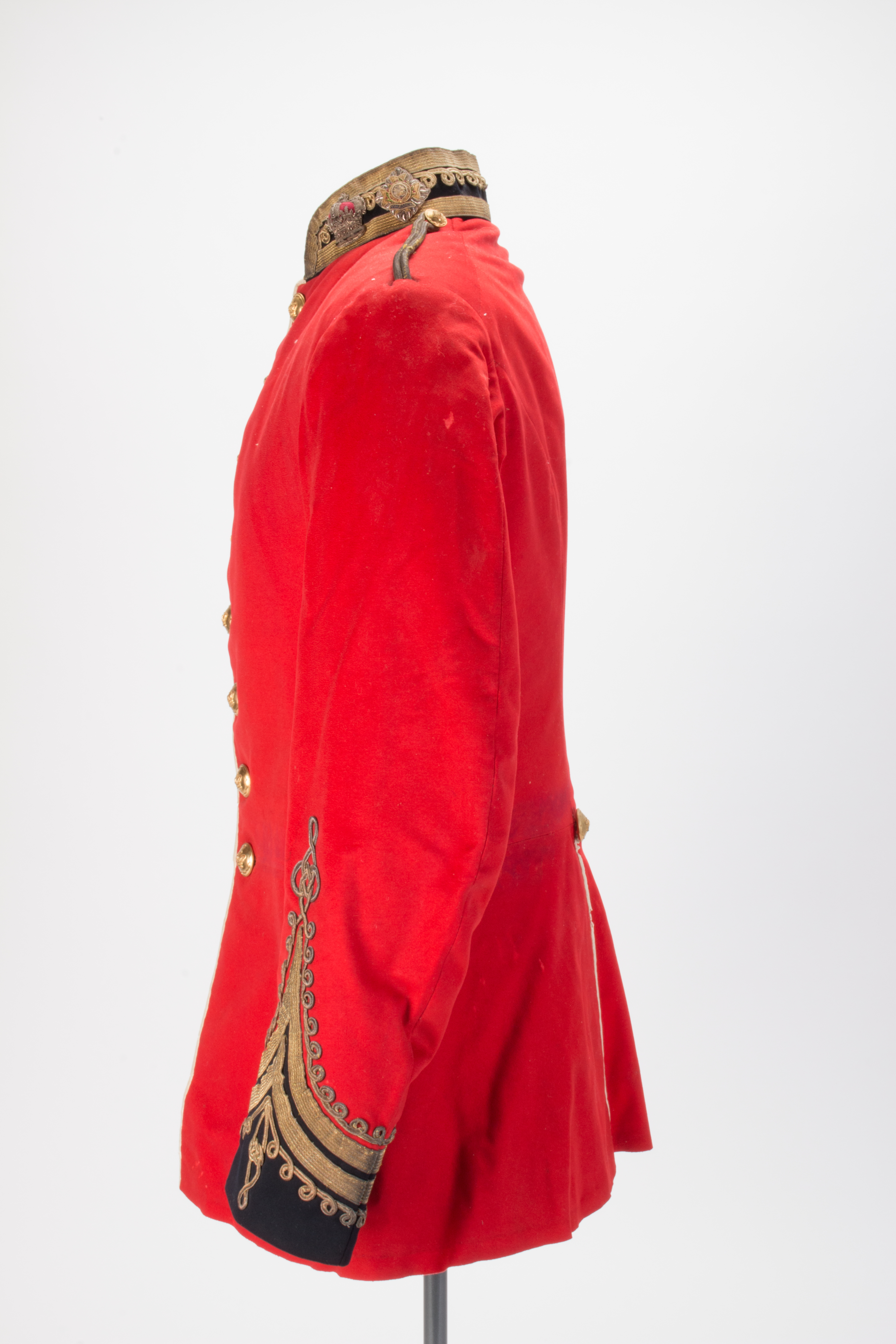
Auckland Museum

== Legacy ==
Major Bridge Drive, Wahapu, Bay of Islands, New Zealand
