= St John the Baptist Church, Waimate North =

St John the Baptist Church
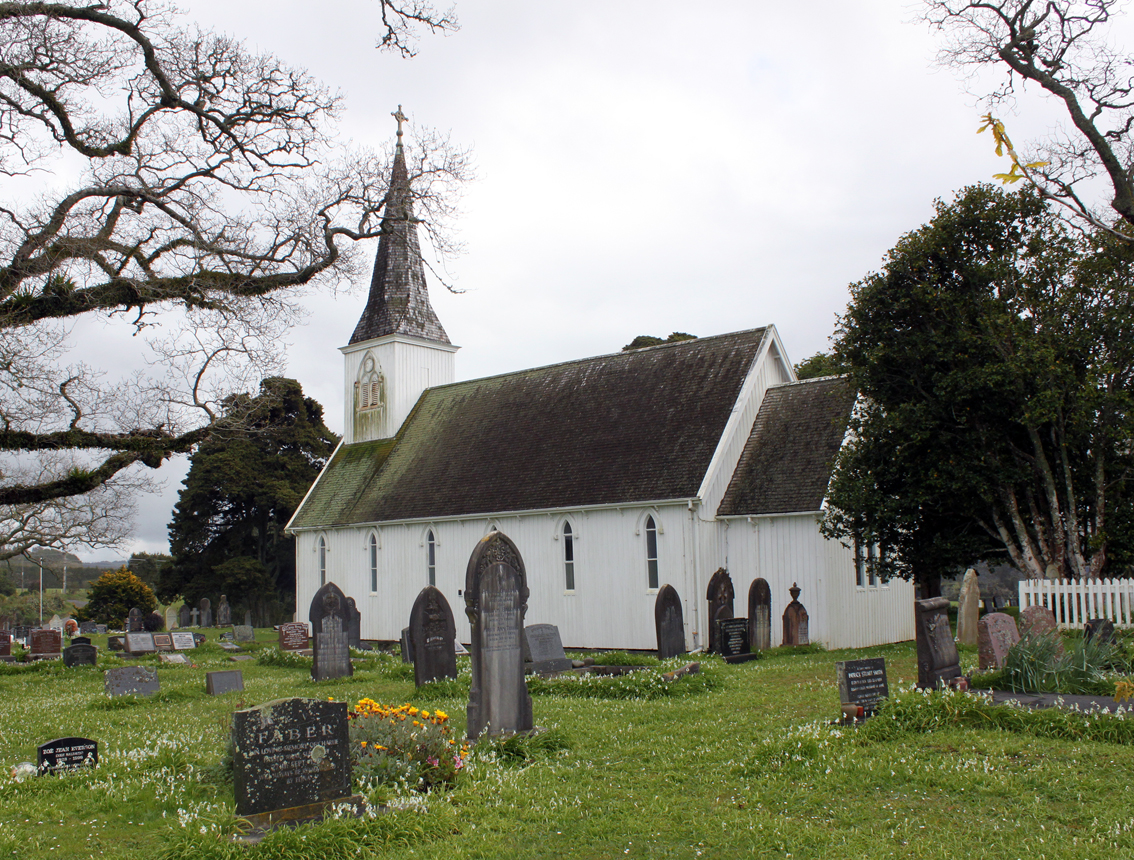
- St John the Baptist Church, Waimate North
- St John the Baptist Church
- 35°18′00″S 173°52′35″E
- Address: 344 Te Ahu Ahu Road, Te Waimate mission, Waimate North, inland from the Bay of Islands
- Country: New Zealand
- Denomination: Anglican
- Religious order: Church Missionary Society
- Website: waimatenorthparish.org.nz/st-john-the-baptist/

History
- Status: Church
- Founded: May 1831
- Founder: Bishop George Selwyn
- Dedication: John the Baptist

Architecture
- Functional status: Active
- Years built: 1831, 1870-1871

Administration
- Province: Anglican Church in Aotearoa, New Zealand and Polynesia
- Diocese: Auckland
- Parish: Waimate North

Clergy
- Vicar: Rev. Elgin Edwards

Heritage New Zealand – Category 1
- Official name: Church of St John the Baptist (Anglican) and Churchyard
- Designated: 6 June 1984
- Reference no.: 64

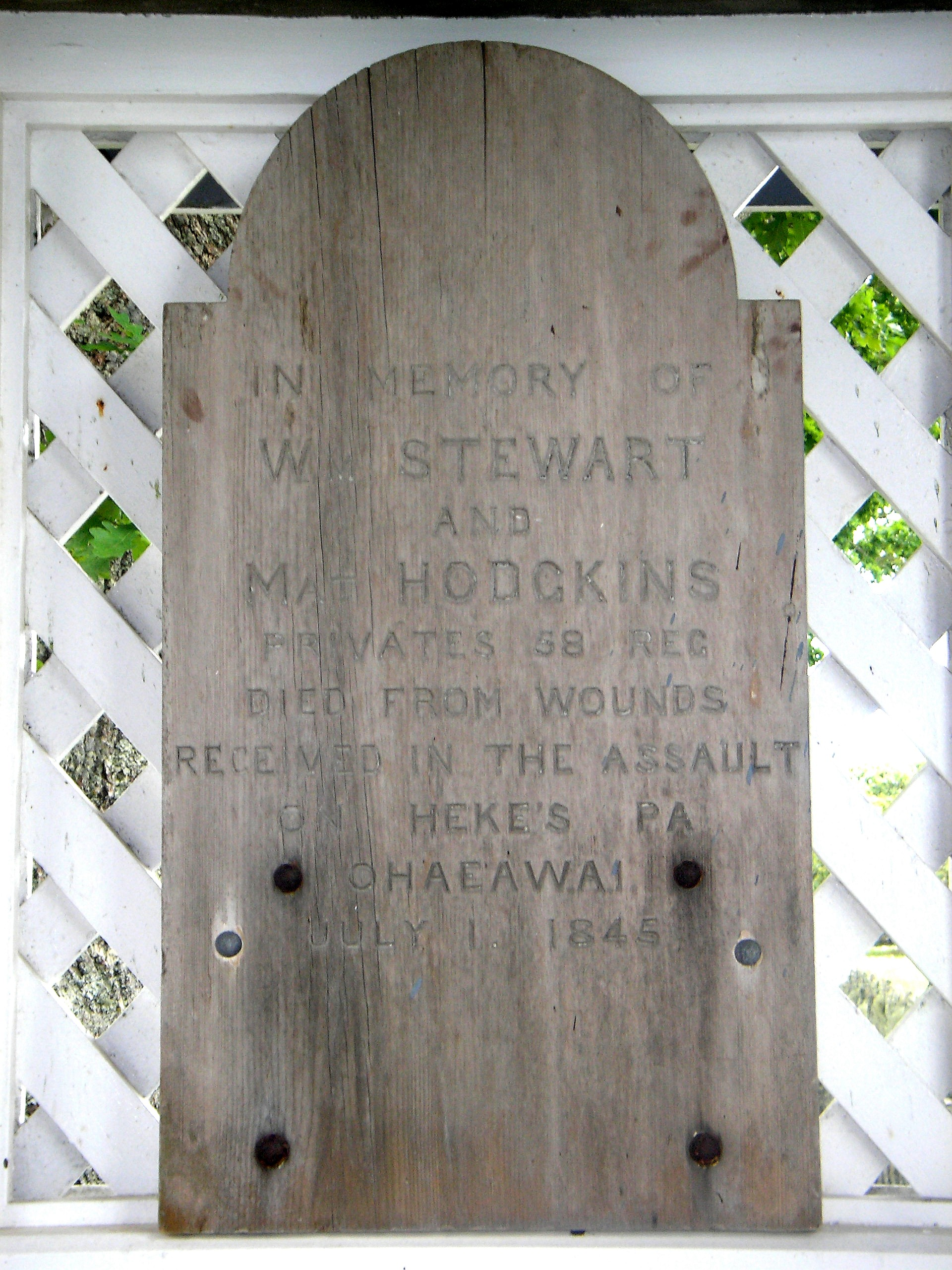
Wooden headstone for two of the British soldiers killed at Ohaeawai, preserved at the mission

St John the Baptist Church is an heritage-listed Anglican Church and associated churchyard built in 1831 by the Church Missionary Society (CMS) at Te Waimate mission at Waimate North, inland from the Bay of Islands, in New Zealand.

== History ==
In 1841, it became the first seat of Bishop George Selwyn when he arrived in New Zealand to take up his appointment as the first Anglican Bishop of New Zealand. Bishop Selwyn established St. John’s College at the mission in June 1842 to provide theology to candidates for ordination into the Anglican Church. On 26 September 1844 Bishop Selwyn presided over the first Synod held in New Zealand at the church.

During the Flagstaff War soldiers from the 58th and 99th Regiments, casualties of the Battle of Ohaeawai (July 1845), were buried in the graveyard of the church, including Captain Grant of the 58th Regiment, and Lieutenant George Phillpotts of HMS Hazard.

The construction of the church at Te Waimate was commenced in May 1831 and it was completed in six weeks. The name of the church was chosen as St John the Baptist day fell on 24 June. The original church also served as a school room.

The first child baptised at the church was Edward Blomfield Clarke on 10 July 1831. The first church wedding of two Europeans in New Zealand was conducted on 11 October 1831, between William Gilbert Puckey (26), son of a CMS carpenter, William Puckey, and Matilda Elizabeth Davis (17), second daughter of the Rev. Richard Davis.

The existing St John the Baptist Church was built in 1870 and 1871.

== List of clergymen (1830–1909) ==
The clergymen appointed to St John the Baptist Church were:

- Rev. William Yate (CMS) (1830–1834)
- Rev. William Williams (CMS) (1834–1840)
- Rev. Richard Taylor (CMS) (1840–1842)
- Rev. Thomas Whytehead, Rev. William Charles Cotton and Rev. William Charles Dudley (1842–1844), when St John the Baptist Church was the seat of Bishop Selwyn.
- Rev. Robert Burrows (CMS) (1844–1854)
- Rev. Richard Davis (CMS) (1845–1854) at Kaikohe; at Waimate (1854-1863)
- Piripi Patiki (CMS) was appointed in 1863 as deacon.
- Ven. Edward Blomfield Clarke (CMS) acted as vicar (1871–1884)
- Rev. Phillip Walsh was appointed as vicar (1884-1909)

In 1886 the CMS gave control over the church to the Diocesan Trust Board.

=== List of Archdeacons (1830–1909) ===
Bishop Selwyn appointed the Rev. Henry Williams as Archdeacon of Te Waimate on 21 September 1844.

- Ven. Henry Williams (CMS) (1844-1867)
- Ven. Edward Blomfield Clarke (CMS) (1870-1901)
- Ven. Phillip Walsh (1901-1909)

== St John’s College at Te Waimate Mission ==
In June 1842 Bishop Selwyn set up residence at Te Waimate Mission. Some buildings were converted for use by St John’s College to teach theology to candidates for ordination into the Anglican Church. The candidates for ordination as deacons were:

- Richard Davis (11 June 1843)
- Seymour Mills Spencer, William Bollard and Henry Francis Butt (24 September 1843)
- William Colenso, Thomas Chapman, James Hamlin, Joseph Matthews and Christopher Pearson Davies (22 September 1844)

In late 1844 Bishop Selwyn moved his residence and St John’s College to Auckland.
