= Battle of Ruapekapeka =

1845–46 New Zealand engagement between British and Ngāpuhi

- Part of Flagstaff War
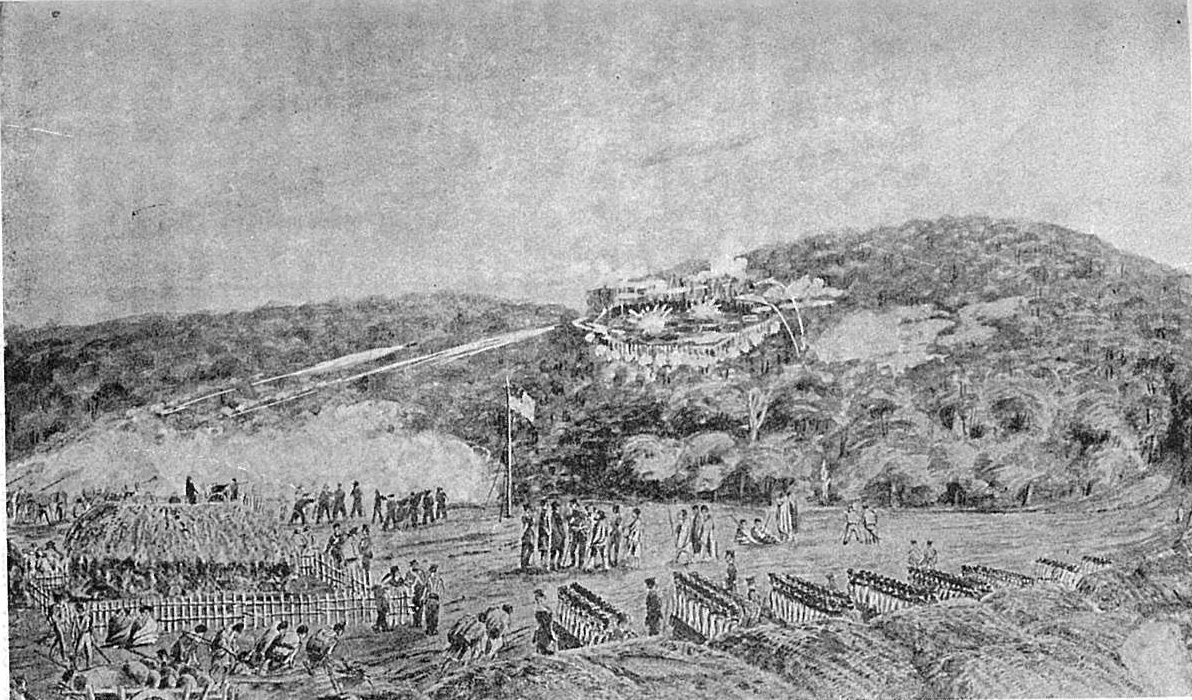
- The bombardment of Ruapekapeka, January 1846. Artist: Cyprian Bridge, Major, 58th Regiment
| Location | 20 kilometres (12 mi) southeast of Kawakawa 35°27′23″S 174°08′37″E |

Belligerents
| (United Kingdom of Great Britain and Ireland) Col. of New Zealand (United Kingdom of Great Britain and Ireland) Loyalist Māori | Rebel Māori |

Commanders and leaders
| (United Kingdom of Great Britain and Ireland) Henry Despard; Tāmati Wāka Nene | Te Ruki Kawiti; Hōne Heke |

Units involved
| (United Kingdom of Great Britain and Ireland) Royal Navy: HMS Castor; HMS North Star; HMS Racehorse; HMS Calliope; Royal Marines; (East India Company) East India Co.: HEICS Elphinstone; HEIC Artillery (Bombay Horse Artillerymen serving as marines); (United Kingdom of Great Britain and Ireland) British Army: 58th Regiment; 99th Regiment; Ordnance: Royal Engineers; Royal Artillery; HM Treasury: Commissariat; Auckland Militia: Volunteer Pioneers; Maori Allies: Tāmati Wāka Nene; Eruera Maihi Patuone; Nōpera Panakareao; Repa; Mohi Tāwhai | Taua: Te Ruki Kawiti; Hōne Heke |

Strength
| Military; 68 officers + 1,110 men Maori Allies; 450 warriors | Ruapekapeka; ~500 warriors |

Casualties and losses
| Military; 13 killed 30 wounded Maori Allies; 8–10 killed 15–20 wounded | Unknown |

The Battle of Ruapekapeka took place from late December 1845 to mid-January 1846 between British forces, under command of Lieutenant Colonel Henry Despard, and Māori warriors of the Ngāpuhi iwi (tribe), led by Hōne Heke and Te Ruki Kawiti, during the Flagstaff War in the Bay of Islands, New Zealand.

The battle site was a pā located 20 kilometres (12 mi) southeast of Kawakawa, which was one of the largest and most complex fortifications of its kind in New Zealand; designed specifically to resist British cannon fire. Its earthworks can still be seen.

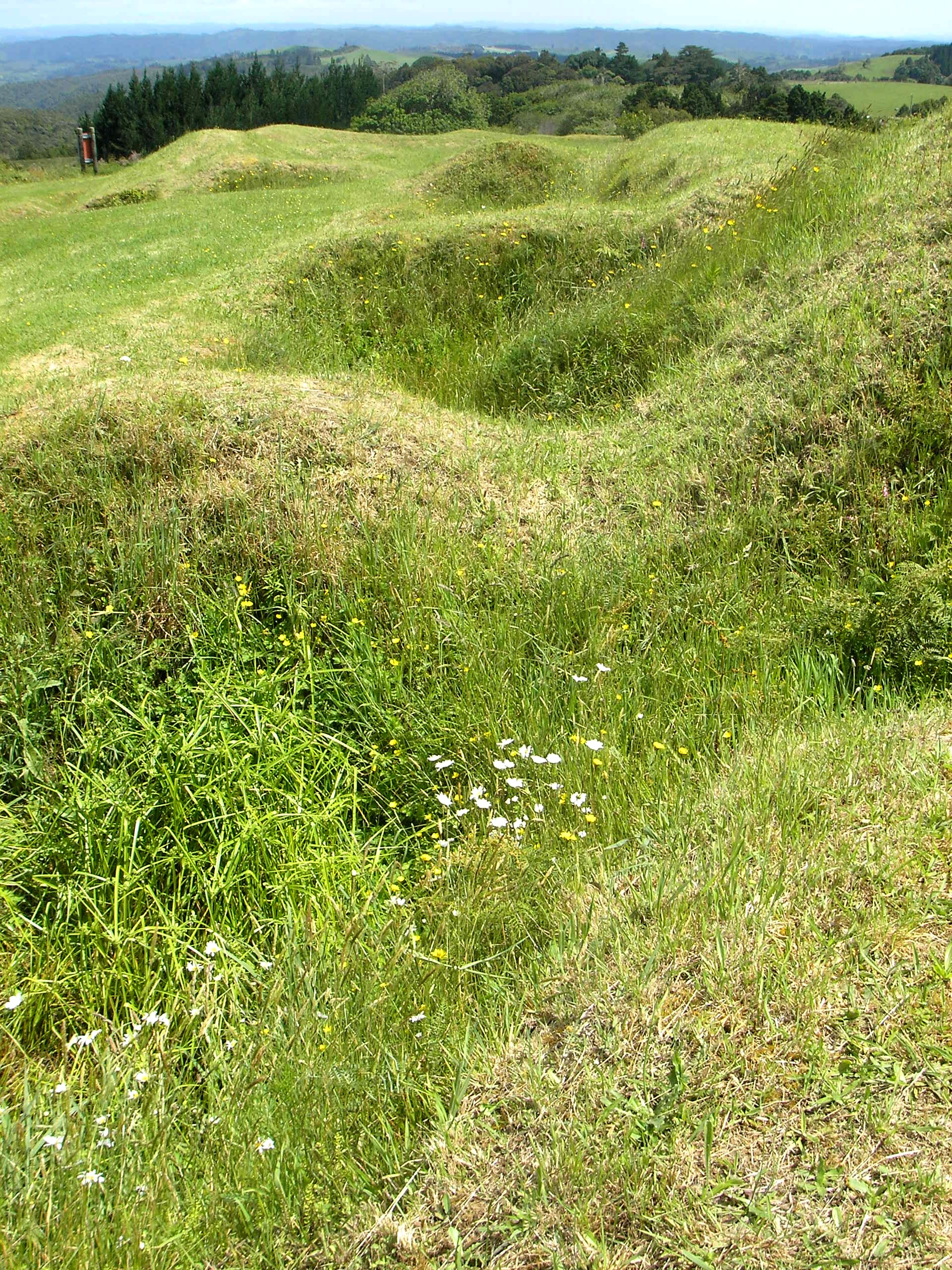
Surviving earthworks at Ruapekapeka

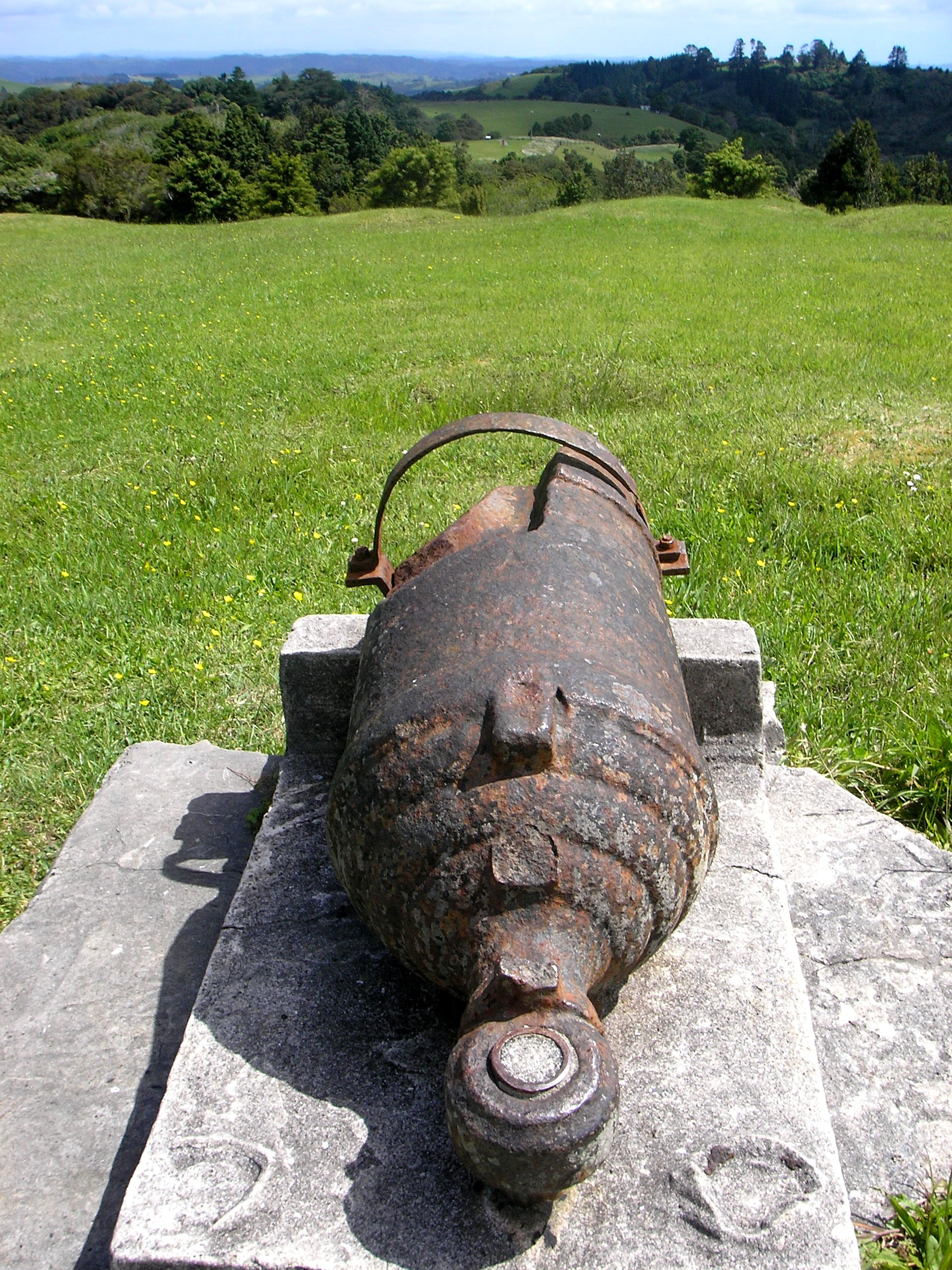
Ruapekapeka's broken 12-pounder carronade facing the British advanced position (the grassed area in mid distance)

== Ruapekapeka pā ==
The pā was named Rua Pekapeka (the Bat's Nest) in relation to deep pihareinga, or dugouts with access through narrow circular entrances above to bomb-proof shelters below, which protected the garrison during bombardment. These rua or "caves looked like calabashs buried underground, the narrow end uppermost", and could accommodate 15 to 20 people.

Te Ruki Kawiti and his allies, including Mataroria and Motiti, designed Ruapekapeka pā as a further development of what is now called the "gunfighter pā" design that was used at the Battle of Ōhaeawai. It was constructed during 1845, in a good defensive position, in an area of no strategic value, well away from non-combatants, as a challenge to British rule. Ruapekapeka Pā improved on the plan of the pā at Ōhaeawai, the site of a battle in the Flagstaff War.

The outer walls of the pā had trenches (parepare) in front of and behind palisades that were 3 metres (9.8 ft) high, built using pūriri logs. Since the introduction of muskets the Māori had learnt to cover the outside of the palisades with layers of flax (Phormium tenax) leaves, making them effectively bulletproof as the velocity of musket balls was dissipated by the flax leaves. On some of the sides of the pā there were three rows of palisades and on other sides two rows of palisades. There were passages between the front and back trenches (parepare), so that warriors could move forward to fire and return to shelter to reload. On the high ground an observation tower was erected. At the rear of the pā a well, some 5 metres (16 ft) deep, was dug into a sandstone formation to provide a water-supply during the expected siege of the pā.

== Battle of Ruapekapeka Pā ==
When the new British Governor, Sir George Grey, failed to end the Flagstaff War by negotiation, he assembled a British force of 1,168 men in the Bay of Islands to deal with Hōne Heke and Te Ruki Kawiti. In early December 1845 the Colonial forces, commanded by Lieutenant Colonel Despard, moved by water towards Ruapekapeka and began a two-week advance over 20 kilometres (12 mi) to bring artillery up to the pā.

The ordnance used in the battle were three naval 32-pounder guns, one 18-pounder gun, two 12-pounder howitzers, one light 6-pounder brass field gun, four 5½" brass Mann mortars designed for New Zealand service, and two Congreve rocket-tubes—24-pounder and 12-pounder. Despard reported the positions of ordnance on 9 January 1846.

Our present position before the pa is as follows: The main camp is placed on an open piece of ground, or rather ridge, with deep-wooded valleys either side, and thick woods both in front and rear: the distance from the pa supposed to be about 750 yards. In our front there are three guns (one 32-pounder, one 12-pound howitzer, and one light 6-pounder), with an apparatus for throwing rockets. From this position several shells have been thrown into the pa, as well as rockets, and much execution must have been done by them, as they were well directed.

Within the larger stockade, which at the utmost cannot be more than 400 yards from the pa, there are two 32-pounders and four small 5½ inch mortars; and the wood in front of these guns has been so completely cut down that nearly the whole face of the pa is now open to their fire.

The small advanced stockade contains one 18-pounder and one 12-pound howitzer, and commands a range not only along the same face (the western) that is exposed to the fire of our other batteries, but will also range along the southern face, and I expect to destroy the defences on the south-west angle.

It had taken two weeks to bring the heavy guns into range of the pā. Bombardment started on 27 December 1845. The directing officers were Lieutenant Alleyne Bland, HMS Racehorse, and Lieutenant Leeds, HEICS Elphinstone, Lieutenant Charles Randle Egerton, HMS North Star, was in charge of firing the rocket-tubes. Bombardment and an incomplete siege commenced on 27 December 1845 (the British lacking the manpower to completely surround the pā). Several weeks of siege punctuated by skirmishing followed. The guns were fired with accuracy throughout the siege causing considerable damage to the palisades, although those inside the pā were safe in the underground shelters.

The colonial forces consisted of the 58th Regiment under the command of Lieutenant Colonel Robert Wynyard), 99th Regiment under Captain Archibald William Reed, and 42 Auckland volunteers under Captain Thomas Ringrose Atkyns. The Commanding Royal Engineer was Captain William Biddlecomb Marlow. Tāmati Wāka Nene, Eruera Maihi Patuone, Tawhai, Repa, and Nopera Panakareao led around 450 warriors in support of the colonial forces. The soldiers were supported by the Royal Marines (under Captain Langford) and sailors from HMS Castor, HMS Racehorse, HMS North Star, HMS Calliope, and the 18-gun sloop HEICS Elphinstone of the Honourable East India Company.

Ruapekapeka's garrison had a 12-pounder carronade from HMS Hazard's boat and a serviceable 4-pounder gun, both taken at Kororāreka. After three attempts, a navy 18-pounder gunner broke the carronade with a direct hit. In any event, Māori defenders had limited supplies of gunpowder and shot, such that the possession of these guns did not assist them in the defence of Ruapekapeka. Māori were armed with double-barrel muzzle-loading muskets (Tupara), flintlock muskets (Ngutuparera, so-called because the hammer holding the flint looked like a duck's beak) as well as some pistols.

The siege continued for some two weeks, punctuated by skirmishing from the pā to keep everyone alert. Then, early in the morning of Sunday, 11 January 1846, William Walker Turau, the brother of Eruera Maihi Patuone, discovered that the pā appeared to have been abandoned, although Te Ruki Kawiti and a few of his warriors remained behind and appeared to have been caught unaware by the British assault. A small group of British troops pushed over the palisade and entered the pā, finding it almost empty. They were reinforced, while Māori tried to re-enter the pā from the back. After a four-hour gun fight the remaining Māori withdrew, abandoning the pā. Lieutenant Colonel Despard claimed the outcome as a "brilliant success". The Royal Marines and sailors from HMS Hazard, HMS North Star and HMS Calliope saw action in the battle. The "Official Despatches" released for publication on 17 January 1846 stated that casualties in the British forces were 3 soldiers killed and 11 wounded; 2 marines killed and 3 wounded; 7 seamen killed and 12 wounded; and 2 pioneers killed and 1 wounded. However other published sources give different casualty figures: Reverend Richard Davis noted in his diary of 14 January 1846, that 12 were killed and 30 wounded; Māori casualties are unknown, (Heke and Kawiti later said they had lost around 60 dead during the whole of the campaign).

For the record, Captain William Marlow, RE, Lieutenant Leeds, HEICN, and John Peter du Moulin, Commissariat, surveyed Ruapekapeka soon after the battle and produced the plan and sectional views of the pa from which drawings and models since have been derived. Similarly, Mr John George Nops, Master, HMS Racehorse, assisted by Mr Groves, Midshipman, HMS Racehorse, also surveyed the pa, as well as the road specifically constructed for the siege.

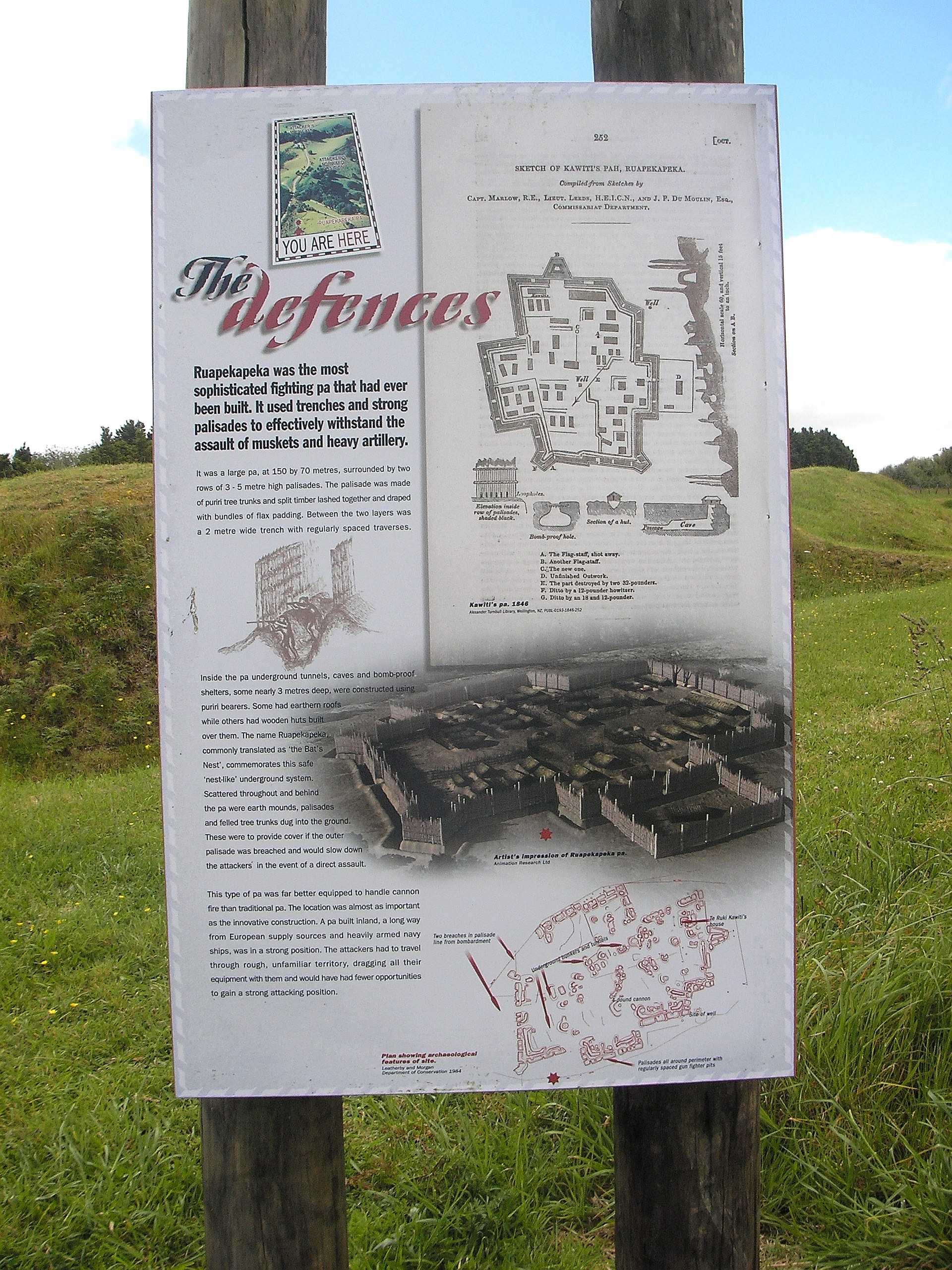
Plans of the pā, in front of its remains

Examination of the pā revealed that it had been very well designed and very strongly built. In different circumstances it could have withstood a long and costly siege. Lieutenant Henry Colin Balneavis, 58th Regiment, who took part in the siege, commented in his journal for 11 January:

Pa burnt. Ruapekapeka found a most extraordinary place,—a model of engineering, with a treble stockade, and huts inside, these also fortified. A large embankment in rear of it, full of under-ground holes for the men to live in; communications with subterranean passages enfilading the ditch. Two guns were taken,—a small one, and an 18-pounder, the latter dismantled by our fire. It appeared that they were in want of food and water. It was the strongest pa ever built in New Zealand.

The reason why the defenders appeared to have abandoned but then re-entered the pā is the subject of continuing debate. It was later suggested that most of the Māori had been at church (many of them were devout Christians). Knowing that their opponents, the British, were also Christians they had not expected an attack on a Sunday. Reverend Richard Davis noted in his diary of 14 January 1846:

Yesterday the news came that the Pa was taken on Sunday by the sailors, and that twelve Europeans were killed and thirty wounded. The native loss uncertain. It appears the natives did not expect fighting on the Sabbath, and were, the great part of them, out of the Pa, smoking and playing. It is also reported that the troops were assembling for service. The tars, having made a tolerable breach with their cannon on Saturday, took the opportunity of the careless position of the natives, and went into the Pa, but did not get possession without much hard fighting, hand to hand.

However, later commentators have cast doubt on this explanation of the events of Sunday 11 January, as fighting had continued on a Sunday at the Battle of Ōhaeawai in July 1845. Yet other later commentators suggested that Heke deliberately abandoned the pā to lay a trap in the surrounding bush, as this would provide cover and give Heke a considerable advantage. In this scenario, Heke's ambush succeeded only partially, as Kawiti's men, fearing their chief had fallen, returned towards the pā and the British forces engaged in battle with the Māori rebels immediately behind the pā.

== Aftermath ==
It was Māori custom that the place of a battle where blood was spilt became tapu so that the Ngāpuhi left Ruapekapeka Pā. After the battle Kawiti and his warriors, carrying their dead, travelled some 4 miles (6.4 km) north-west to Waiomio, the ancestral home of Ngāti Hine.

After the Battle of Ruapekapeka, Kawiti expressed the will to continue to fight, however Kawiti and Heke made it known that they would end the rebellion if the Colonial forces would leave Ngāpuhi land.

Tāmati Wāka Nene acted as an intermediary in the negotiations with Governor Grey. At this time Governor Grey faced new threats of rebellion in the south and would have had logistical difficulties in a lengthy campaign against Heke and Kawiti; although Governor Grey may have underestimated the difficulties the essentially part-time Māori force would experience in continuing to fight against the Colonial forces. Governor Grey accepted Tāmati Wāka Nene's argument that clemency was the best way to ensure peace in the North. Heke and Kawiti were pardoned and no land was confiscated.

Lieutenant Henry Balneavis, 58th Regiment, created a model of Ruapekapeka pā as a part of the New Zealand showcase at the Great Exhibition in London, in 1851.
