= George Phillpotts =

British naval officer (1814–1845)

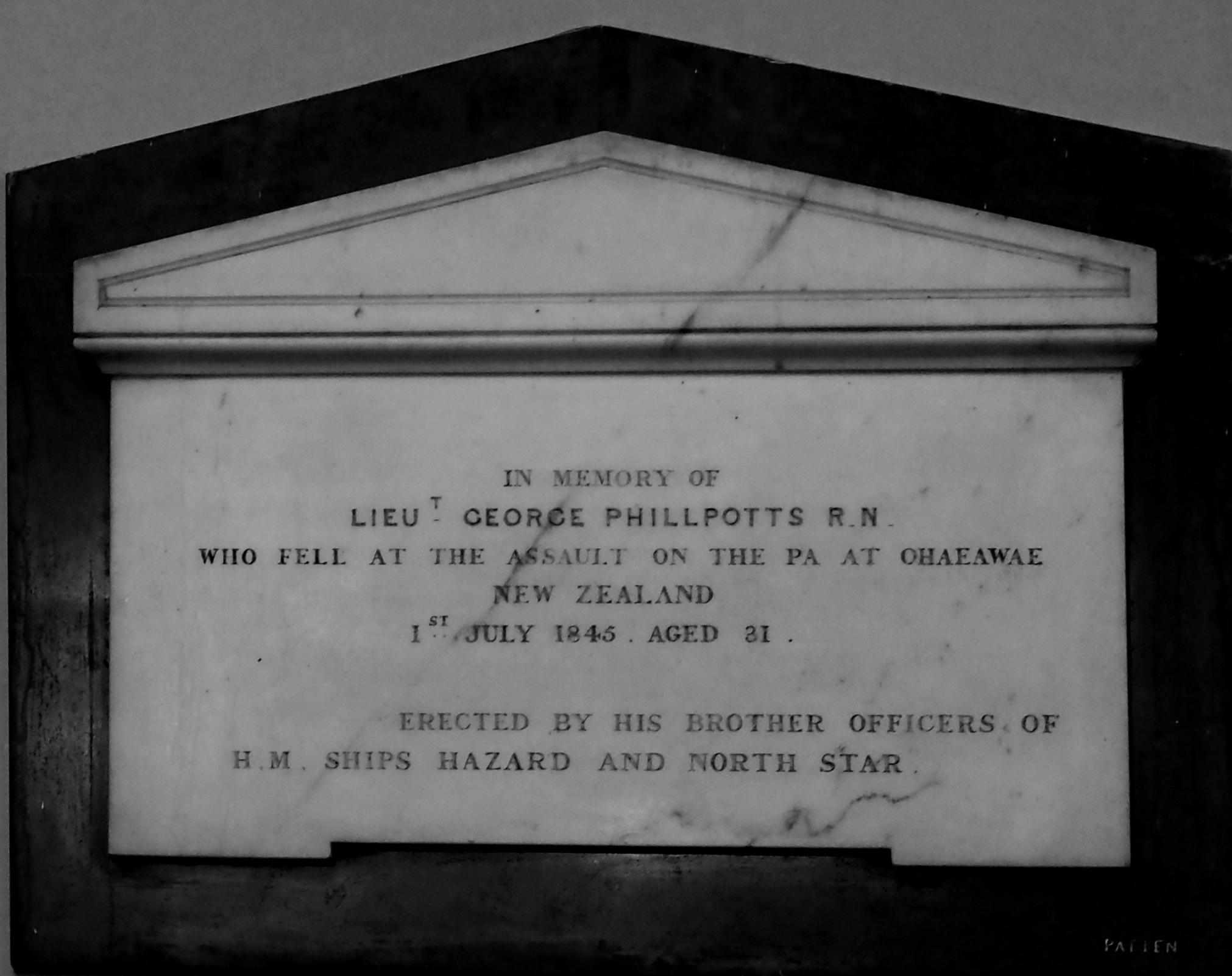
- Memorial to George Phillpotts in St James' Church, Sydney
- Born: January 1814; Durham, England
- Died: 1 July 1845 (aged 31); Ōhaeawai, New Zealand
- Burial place: St John the Baptist Church Cemetery, Waimate North, Northland, New Zealand
- Relatives: Henry Phillpotts (father); John Phillpotts (uncle); George Phillpotts, RE (uncle); William Phillpotts (brother); Eden Phillpotts (cousin)
- Military career
- Allegiance: United Kingdom
- Branch: Royal Navy
- Service years: 1827–1845
- Rank: Lieutenant
- Nicknames: Toby or Topi (Māori), Matua Keke (Māori) and Uncle Toby
- Served on: HMS Asia; HMS Comet; HMS Vixen; HMS Hazard
- Commands: HMS Hazard (acting)
- Campaigns: First Opium War; New Zealand Wars; Flagstaff War; Kororāreka; Waikare; Ōhaeawai †
- Memorials: St Michael's Church, Ōhaeawai, Northland (roll of honour); St James' Church, King Street, Sydney, New South Wales (memorial tablet); St Budock Parish Church, Budock Water, Cornwall (memorial stained glass window)

Lieutenant George Phillpotts (1814 – 1 July 1845) was an officer of the Royal Navy.

== Early life ==
George Phillpotts, the eighth of fifteen children of Henry Phillpotts and Deborah Maria Surtees, was born in Durham, England in or before January 1814, and baptised at Durham Cathedral on 26 January 1814. At that time Henry was a canon of Durham Cathedral, 9th prebend, as well as curate of St Margaret's Church, Durham. He became Bishop of Exeter in 1831.

== Career ==
George Phillpotts entered the Royal Navy on 5 September 1827, advanced to mate through examination on 26 November 1833, served on HMS Asia. He also served on HMS Comet. However, in January 1841, General William Dyott, 63rd Regiment, observed that he'd left the navy and was helping his friend Dick Dyott, the General's son, and the Conservative Party:

On the 6th a friend of Dick's, Mr. Phillpotts, a son of the Bishop of Exeter's, came for two nights, and was an able help in assisting at our party the following day. He had been in the navy, but on account of his father's politicks could not obtain promotion and quitted, and was employing himself in a colliery and in iron works at Dudley. Dick made acquaintance with him at Plymouth when he was serving as midshipman. He is a nice gentlemanlike youngster.

The Western Times had reported his predicament in March 1839, that:

Bishop Phillpotts has a son of most extraordinary naval abilities—who has displayed valour the most consummate, zeal unabated and unwearied in every clime, discretion the most profound, and talent the most distinguished; and yet he is only a middy after twelve years service, and the infernal whigs will not promote him.

Vouched correct by the West of England Conservative, the Northampton Herald had earlier noted that during those midshipman years:

he has been in active service, and has been in almost every part of the globe. He is a young man possessing most distinguished talent, consummate personal bravery, and unsullied reputation. Testimonials as to his character were signed by every commanding officer, without exception, under whom he has served. Under the sanction of these testimonials he made an application to the Admiralty for promotion, but a hint not be misunderstood was given to him, that the name Phillpotts alone was a bar to all promotion, however in every other respect he might be deserving of it.

Phillpotts responded to The Times that the statement contained in the Northampton Herald was incorrect, and entirely unauthorised by him or his family.

Phillpotts received his commission in the Royal Navy with rank of lieutenant on 12 November 1841. On 8 February 1842 he was appointed to the newly commissioned HM Steam Sloop Vixen, under Commander Henry Boyes, RN, being manned and provisioned at Plymouth, England, for her maiden voyage to the East India station and China.

=== China ===
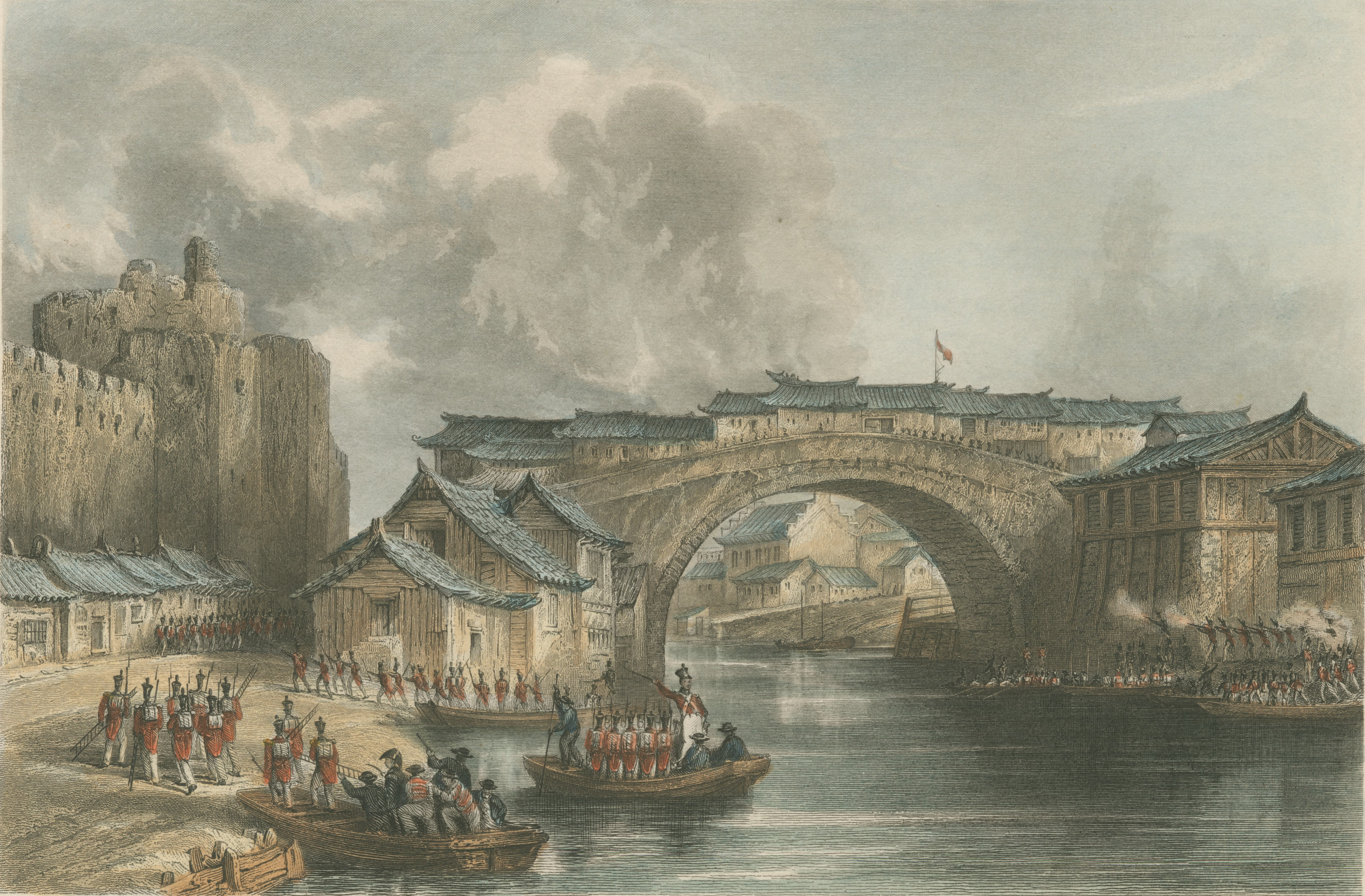
West gate of Chinkiang, 21 July 1842. Artist: Thomas Allom, 1843, after a sketch by James Stoddart, RN, HMS Cornwallis

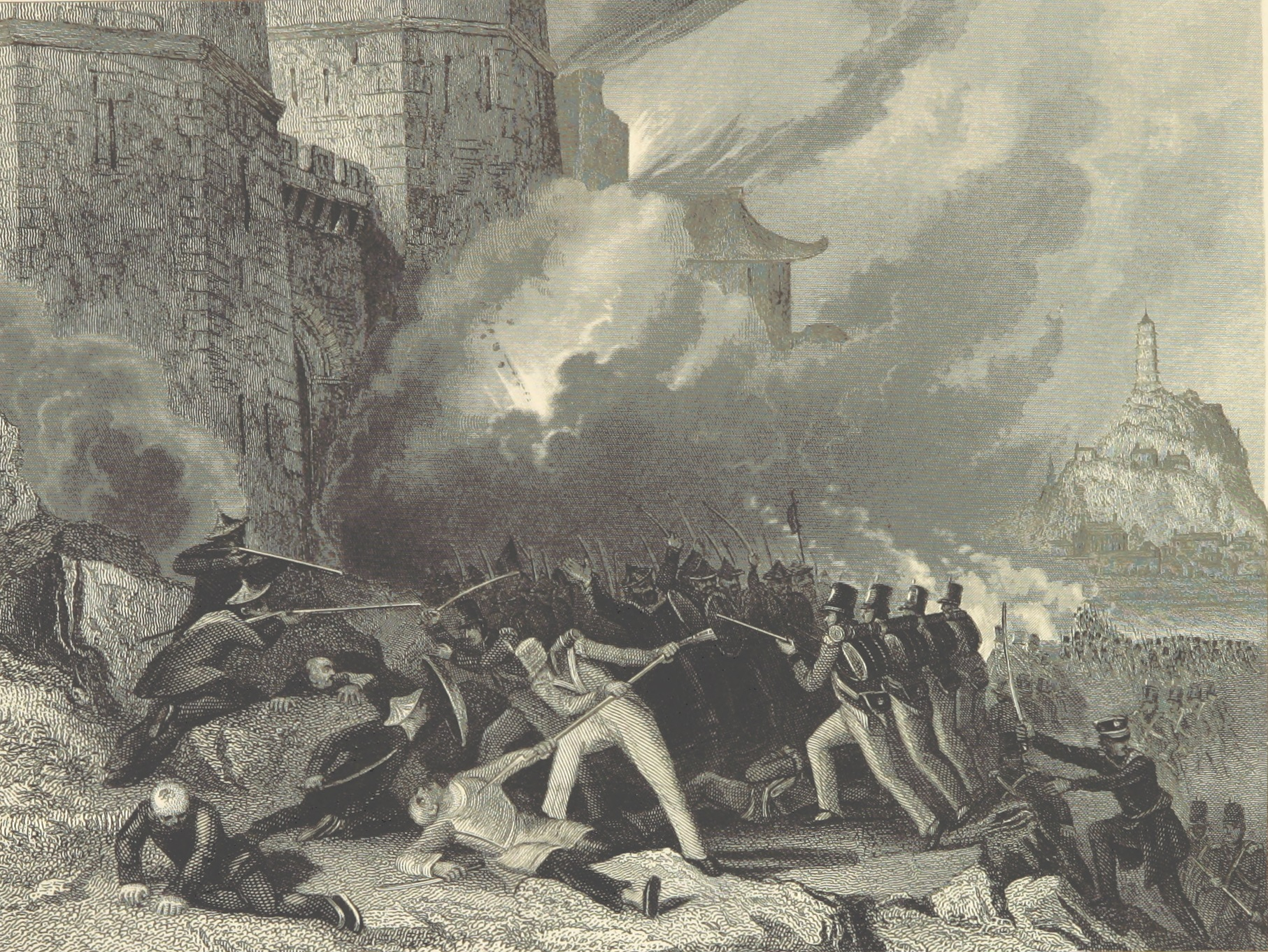
Capture of Chinkiang, 21 July 1842. Artist: Thomas Allom

Vixen, as part of long expected reinforcements from England and India for the First Anglo-Chinese War, HMS Hazard amongst them, joined the British fleet at anchor off Chapoo, China, in May 1842, Then whilst off Woosung following the capture of the town, Vixen was placed in company with HM Ships Cornwallis, Calliope, transport Marion with Sir Hugh Gough and staff, and seven other transports in the first of the six divisions of the General Squadron, for the cruise up the Yangtze River on 6 July to Nanking. She took Cornwallis in tow up to Kin Shan (Golden Island). In the afternoon of 15 July, Gough and Sir William Parker went on in the Vixen to reconnoitre Kin Shan and the approaches to Chinkiang at the entrance of the South Grand Canal. Vixen's officers and sailors assisted in the storming and capture of Chinkiang on 21 July 1842.

Having passed Kin Shan, Vixen came alongside the flagship HMS Cornwallis on 3 August and took her in tow up the river to anchor off the batteries at Nanking. She stood in the river with HM Ships Cornwallis, Blonde, Modeste, Childers, Clio, Driver, and HEIC steamers Auckland, Queen, Pluto, Phlegathon and Medussa during the treaty negotiations that bought an end to the war.

For their participation, Vixen's crew were eligible for the China War Medal (1842).

=== New South Wales ===
Lieutenant Phillpotts was appointed to HMS Hazard, under Commander Charles Bell, RN, on 15 December 1842, the day of her arrival at Sydney, New South Wales. After China, Hazard had left Singapore on 18 October, Anyer, Indonesia on 1 November, for refitting in Sydney into January 1843.

==== South Sea cruises ====
On 25 January Hazard departed Sydney for Tahiti, following HMS Vindictive, which had sailed several days before carrying the British Consul, George Pritchard, to that place. In case of hostilities, Commander Bell was to report to the Admiral of the South American Station for further instructions. Subsequent to visiting Tahiti, Hazard was to cruise the South Seas in search of the whaler Water Witch, which had been carried off by its mate. They arrived back in Sydney on 24 March.

HMS Hazard left Sydney for Hobart on 11 or 12 April 1843, then headed to Tahiti a few days after its arrival.

Whilst at Oʻahu, Hawaii, Hazard went to San Blas, Mexico, in January 1844, to bring William Miller, Consul General of the Sandwich Islands and the Pacific, and suite, to Hawaii. Thereafter they left Honolulu, Oʻahu, for Lahaina, Maui, on 8 February, for presentation to the King of Hawaii, Kamehameha III on 10 February and signing of the Convention Between Great Britain and the Sandwich Islands on 12 February. Hazard then sailed for Mazatlán, Mexico, seemingly returning to Hawaii and Tahiti in March.

After the departure of the Shamrock on 8 March, a serious skirmish took place between the Tahitians and French, commencing the Franco-Tahitian War. The Tahitians, assisted by the American and European seamen on the Island, managed to take six field pieces from the French, and kill about eighty. A gunner, formerly of HMS Vindictive, was at the head of the Tahitians.

Captain Bell, of H.M.S. Hazard, on his arrival at Tahiti, sent a boat ashore in command of an officer, which, on reaching, was at once seized by the French guard stationed on Papiete beach, and the officer and his crew were taken prisoners. After a detention, however, of several hours, they were 'sent off' to their ship, with the understanding that 'the subjects of Great Britain could not on any account be allowed to land on that Island,' as the French Governor declared the Island 'to be in a state of siege.' This declaration, on the part of the French Governor, is really too Quixotic to be viewed in any other light than that of pity—the act of besieging an unfortified place, must be brave indeed!

HMS Hazard touched at Tutuila, Samoan Islands in late April, and arrived back in Sydney on 18 May 1844, having traversed at least a distance of 30,000 miles on that cruise. The ship and crew departed Sydney, New South Wales, for Auckland, New Zealand on 4 July 1844.

=== New Zealand ===
HMS Hazard, under the command of Acting Commander David Robertson-Macdonald following Commander Bell's death in August 1844, was in the Bay of Islands, New Zealand at the start of the Flagstaff War.

==== The duellists ====
Late in 1844 or early 1845, Phillpotts was lounging in Wood's Royal Hotel, Auckland, (site of The Northern Club today) reading the Auckland Times when some disagreeable content compelled him dismiss the newspaper as "a rag", and describe other uses to which it could be put. Henry Falwasser, the newspaper's proprietor, was so offended that he called Phillpotts out. The duellists, making their stand near the hotel, effected no injury other than a button off Phillpotts' uniform and a bullet through Falwasser's coat-tail.

==== Flagstaff War ====
===== Kororāreka =====
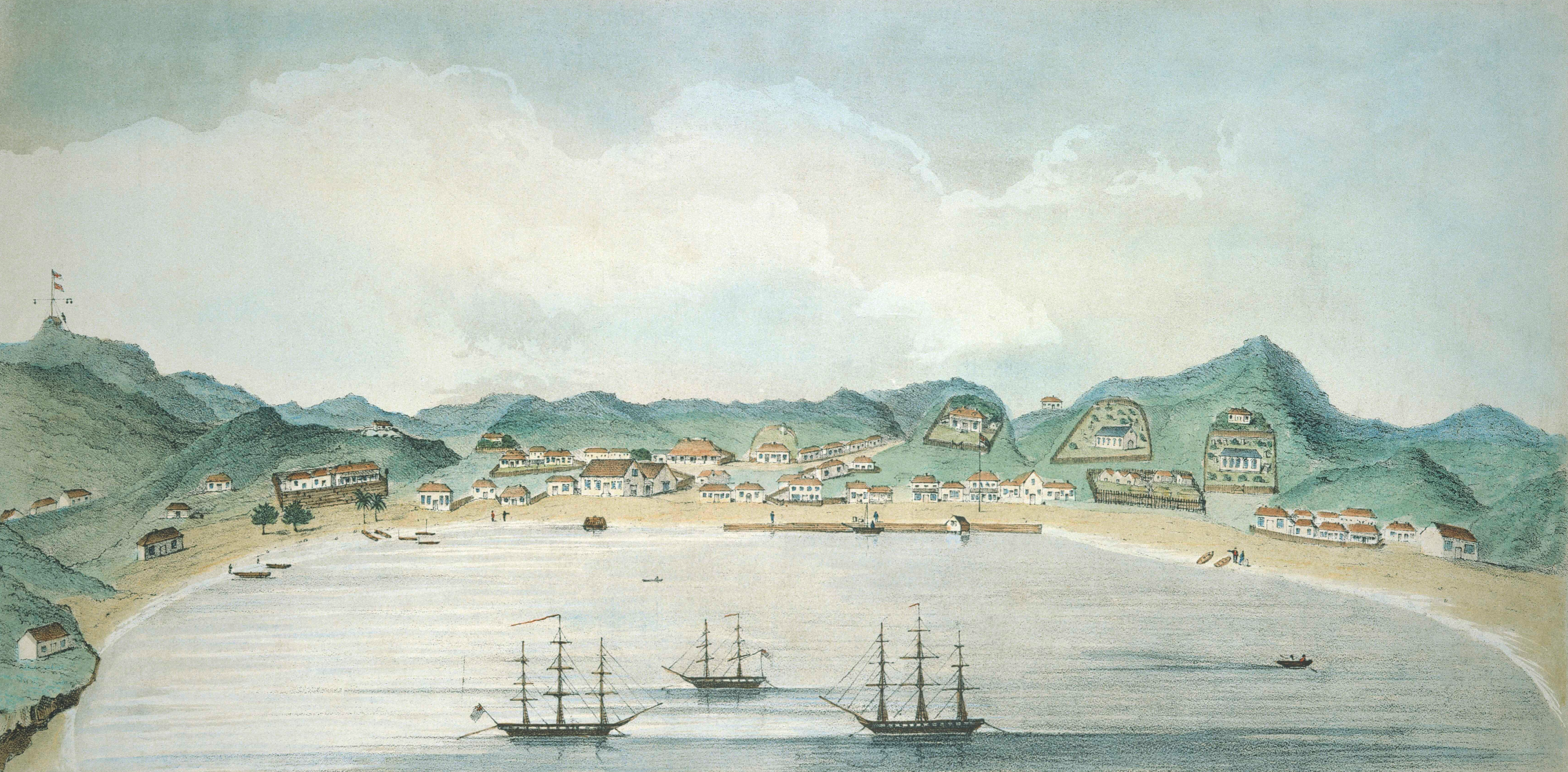
Kororāreka (Russell) before the battle, 10 March 1845

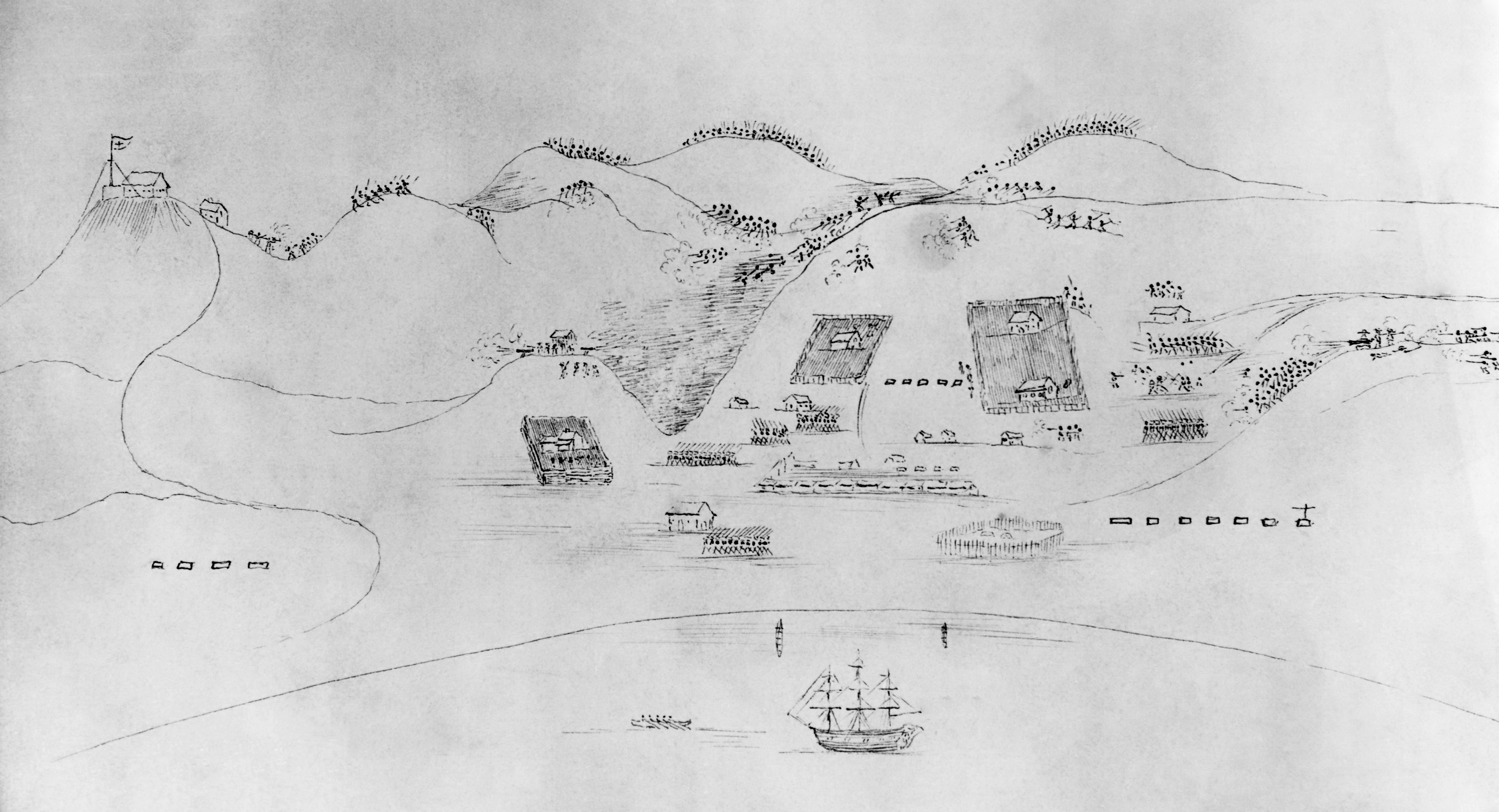
Kororāreka (Russell) during the battle, 11 March 1845

At dawn on Tuesday 11 March 1845, a force of about 600 Māori armed with muskets, double-barrelled guns and tomahawks commenced the Battle of Kororāreka.

Lieutenant Phillpotts, in command of HMS Hazard after Commander Robertson-Macdonald was severely wounded, ordered the bombardment of Kororāreka. In the early hours of Thursday, 13 March, the third day on, HMS Hazard prepared for sea and conveyed the sick and wounded to Auckland. In review of the battle's sequence of unfortunate events on 11 March 1845, Phillpotts reported to Governor FitzRoy on 15 March:

…but the conclusion I have come to is, that had possession of the blockhouse at the flagstaff, in charge of Ensign Campbell, been retained, I should not now be suffering from the feelings naturally occurring to a man who has been subdued.

That it was a defeat I must acknowledge, as I consider losing the flag-staff in the same light as losing a ship.

===== Puketutu =====
On the 7 May 1845, whilst the military forces prepared for battle at Puketutu, Lake Ōmāpere, Phillpotts, under direction of Captain Sir James Everard Home, with parties of seamen of HM Ships North Star and Hazard, burnt five small villages belonging to Heke, broke up two large canoes and brought off two other large ones.

===== Waikare =====
On the night of 15 May 1845, a week after the battle of Puketutu, Major Cyprian Bridge, 58th Regiment, with 200 men of the regiment, 8 marines and a 12-pounder carronade, worked their way up the Waikare river in boats, each with an armed seaman from HMS Hazard, to attempt a surprise attack on the Kapotai pā. Near daybreak, disorientation and tidal groundings had only delivered Bridge, now before the pā, a force of 50 troops and 100 of Tāmati Wāka Nene's warriors. Firing from the pa commenced at daybreak but its inhabitants, wary of the attack, soon moved to abandon it. Nene's warriors supported with company of the 58th fought Kapotai warriors, reinforced by a party of Kawiti's men, in the bush around the pā for some six or seven hours. During the operation, Phillpotts captured two boats, and Bridge allowed Nene's people to take the canoes. The pā was burnt and destroyed.

===== Ōhaeawai =====
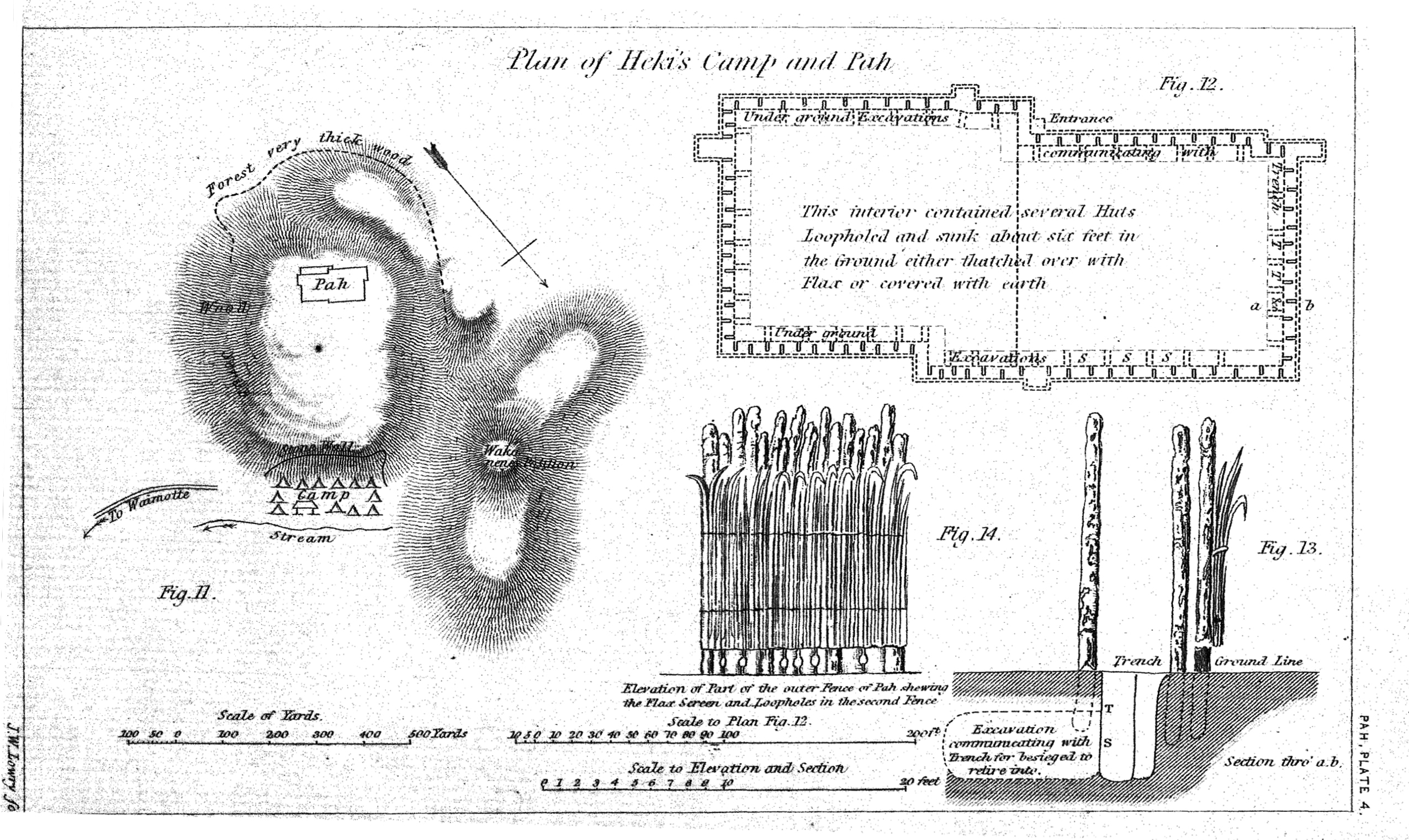
Heke's pā at Ōhaeawai, 1845

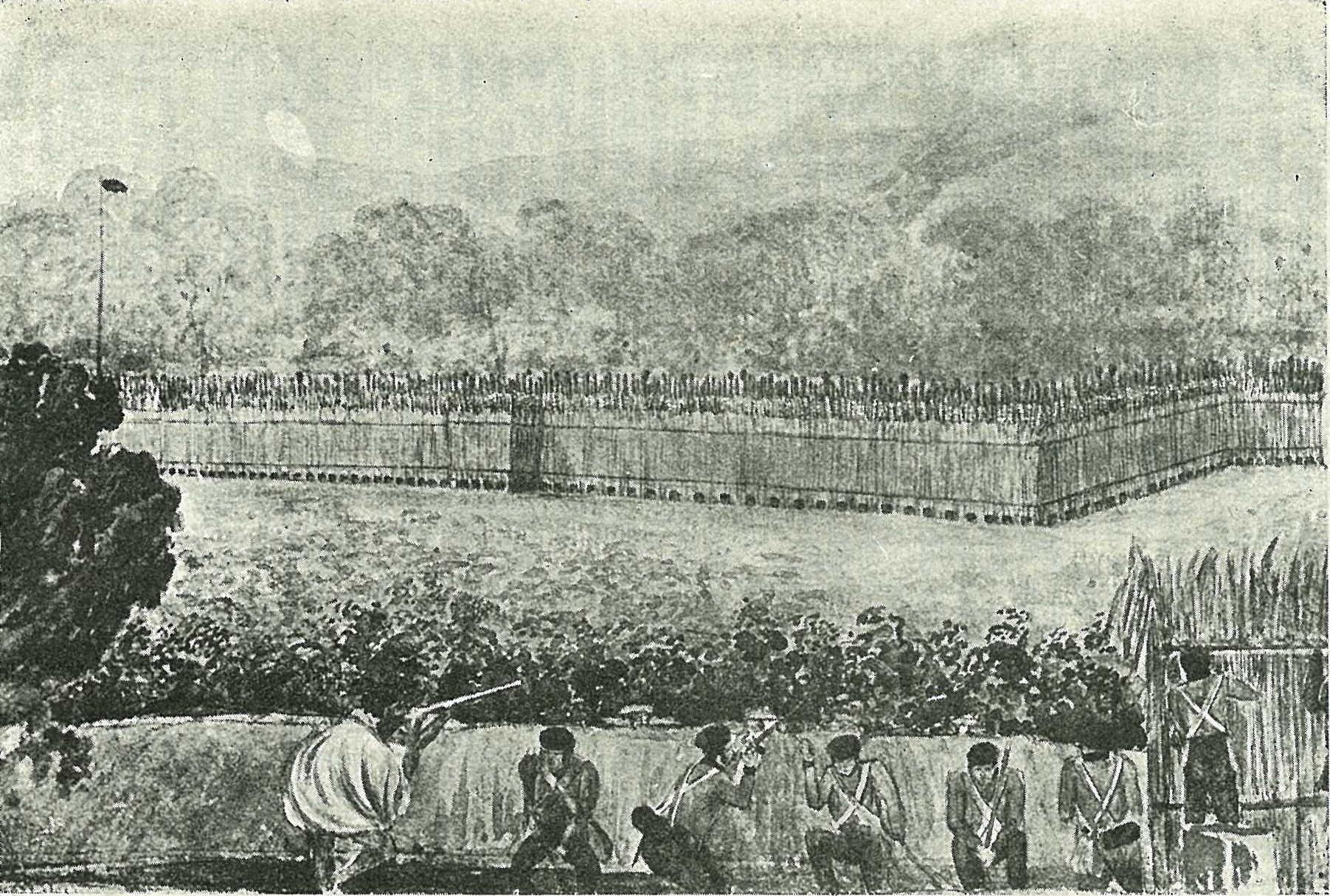
Ōhaeawai pā stormed on 1 July 1845. Artist: Cyprian Bridge, 58th Regiment

George Clarke observed the effect of the battle of Kororāreka upon Phillpotts:

It galled him terribly, and the poor fellow took it as a reflection on his courage, and was very sore about it. It made him reckless, and he joined the camp with the foreboding that he should never return. There were three of us brothers who were free and open guests to the company of officers on board the "Hazard," and, as it happened, two of the officers bore the same distinguished name of Clarke. One day we were all five at dinner, and as you can imagine our several personalities got rather mixed. The two Lieutenants were distinguished by their familiars, one as "Polly" and the other as "Jemima" Clarke, and at Phillpotts suggestion we were nicked off, I, as "Prophecy," Henry as "Litany," and William as "Gospel." Prophecy, Litany and Gospel were our current designations in the fleet to the end of the war. Gospel was a special chum. One day Phillpotts said, "Gospel, I am writing my will, what shall I leave you?" Of course William thought it a joke, and said, "Oh, leave me your Manton".

On 1 July 1845, during the battle of Ōhaeawai, after 32-pounder bombardment of the pā, Colonel Henry Despard put his opinion to his council that the palisades had been loosened and an assault may be successful. Tāmati Wāka Nene advised Despard that there was no breach, and that "the bravest soldiers in the world could not find a passage for two abreast," and Captain William Biddlecomb Marlow, RE, supported him in this view. Colonel William Hulme, 96th Regiment, Captain Johnson, RN, and Marlow protested against Despard's intentions. In consequence, Phillpotts, alone and unarmed, made a daring reconnaissance, walking round the pā to within pistol-shot of the palisades targeted by the gun; so close that his acquaintances within called out "Go back Topi. We cannot let you come nearer, Topi; if you do we must fire". When shots were fired over his head, he exchanged some good-natured chaff with them and sauntered back to British lines.

Perhaps it was not his first reconnaissance. Surveyor Johann Pieter (John Peter) Du Moulin, attached to the Commissariat, noted:

Some days previous to the assault, it was suggested to the commanding officer that a breach might be effected by powder bags. Philpotts volunteered to perform that duty, for which he was snubbed. He then, out of bravado, left the camp, in mid-day, unarmed, and reached the pa to within a few yards; when a native climbed the second row of palisades, and called out, in broken English,—"go back, Toby, or else you will be shot." I was an eye-witness to this piece of foolery. Philpotts was attired in a blue shirt, and (fancy) a tall white felt hat.

Clarke recalled that, on another occasion:

a little after dusk, Phillpotts crept up to the palisade, and began slashing with his cutlass at the flax screen, when, of course, nothing could have been easier than to strike him down, but instead of that an awful voice came from the ground at his feet, not five yards off: "Go away Toby, go away Toby," and he went away.

Phillpotts reported that an assault was impracticable. Tamati Waaka Nene warned Despard again that an assault was absolutely impossible. Even Frederick Manning and John Webster, in Nene's presence, advised Despard against an assault. Despard ordered an assault upon the pā to be made at 3:00 pm.

The storming party was to be composed of columns; the advance made up of 2 sergeants and 20 volunteers who were to silently move up to the stockade; followed closely by the assaulting body under Major Ewan Macpherson, 99th Regiment—40 grenadiers of the 58th, 40 grenadiers of the 99th, accompanied by the bluejackets and 30 volunteer militia pioneers carrying hatchets, ropes and ladders; closely followed by a column of 100 men under Major Cyprian Bridge, 58th Regiment—remaining grenadiers of the 58th, 60 battalion rank and file of the 58th, 40 light company rank and file of the 99th; and a supporting column of 100 men under Colonel Hulme, 96th Regiment—the 96th detachment complete with battalion rank and file of the 58th. Phillpotts, Captain William Grant, 58th Regiment, and Lieutenant Edward Beatty, 99th Regiment, took to leading the forlorn hope.

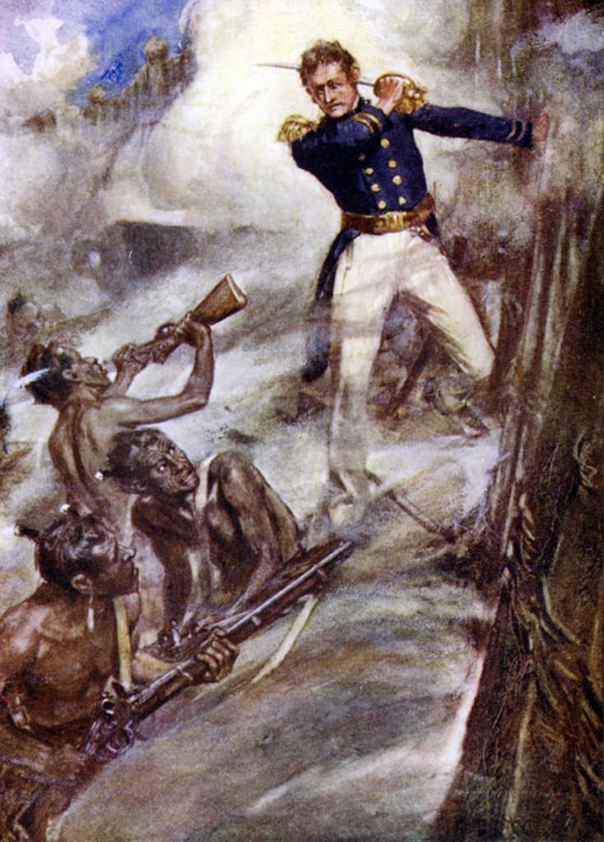
Phillpotts at Ōhaeawai, 1 July 1845. Artist: Arthur David McCormick, 1908

Du Moulin recalled that from the moment before marching off at 3:00 pm:

I left the camp for the knoll, a few hundred yards off, (on the top of which a brass 6-pounder was placed, and at the base a 32-pounder naval gun,) for the purpose of witnessing the assault. On arriving at the naval gun, Philpotts overtook me, and said,—"Here, Mullins, pull these trousers off; I don't want to die a soldier." (They were black cloth, red stripe, soldier's trousers.) He sat on the gun carriage, and I hauled the trousers off, over his boots. He then drew his sword, threw the scabbard into the fern; his forage cap, a soldier's, after the scabbard; and left, attired in a sailor's blue woollen shirt, tight cotton drawers, boots, and naked sword. He followed Major Macpherson's attacking column, which passed us a short distance off. I soon followed Philpotts, instead of going to the top of the knoll; and when within sixty or seventy yards from the pa, I stood behind a dead tree, with my watch in hand. The two attacking columns were Major Bridge, 58th, with the light companies, 58th and 99th; Major Macpherson, 99th, with the grenadier companies. The reserve column under Colonel Hulme, mixed. On the two former reaching the pa, to within twenty-five yards, they received, nearly simultaneously, a fearful volley from the enemy, which killed Captain Grant, and caused a havock in a body of nearly four hundred of the finest of troops, which threw the whole of the two columns into a mass of confusion. The natives continued independent firing, which killed Philpotts...

Du Moulin's sketch plan placed Phillpotts' body just outside the palisade about halfway along the western flank. In a despatch to the Governor, Despard placed Phillpotts endeavouring to force his way through the palisade. Historian James Cowan says that Phillpotts had run: "along the stockade to the right (the west flank), seeking a place to enter; the outer fence had suffered most damage there. He actually climbed the pekerangi, a small portion of which had been loosened by sword-cuts delivered against the torotoro lashings and partly pulled down. There he fell, shot through the body." Other accounts place Phillpotts as having worked his way through the pā's gun embrasure, or breech in the outer palisade, and whilst endeavouring to force a way through the second palisade, was struck through the heart by a stray ball. Arthur McCormick's 1908 illustration imagines him there, beside one of the pā's guns, striking in naval full dress coatee with epaulette and clean white trousers, arm embowed, holding in the hand a sword (as in his family's crest). Shot through the heart, Phillpotts had actually fallen near Grant, who'd been shot through the head close to the palisade. Grant was stripped of his red jacket and belts.

A flag of truce was flown from the pā two days later, with invitation to bury the dead. Cowan's informants recalled that as casualties were carried from the field, the pā 's victors charged out yelling, shaking guns and long-handled tomahawks. A white-headed tattooed warrior ran along the palisade to Phillpotts' body, bent over, cut off a portion of scalp with his tomahawk and burst into incantation offering the first battle-trophy to his god of war, Tūmatauenga. Warriors then performed the tutu-ngarahu war dance with guns and tomahawks. John Webster recalled that a war cry was danced when Phillpotts' scalped body was found.

Archdeacon Henry Williams, in recovering Phillpotts' body, also recovered his eyeglass and a portion of his scalp, found hanging by the inner palisade it was said, which he passed over the Captain Johnson, RN, HMS Hazard. Tāmati Wāka Nene recovered Phillpotts' sword which had been held over within Ohaeawai's palisades during recovery of bodies. He later gave it to the Rev. William Davis.

Grant's body, missing for some time, was later found buried outside the pā a few inches below the surface of the earth with the flesh cut off his buttocks and thick parts of his thigh. He and Phillpotts and were buried at St. John the Baptist Church, Waimate, on 15 July. Beatty, severely wounded in the right side during the attack, died of his wounds at Waimate on 11 or 13 July. Sometime after, to his great surprise and sorrow, William "Gospel" Clarke was handed Phillpotts' Manton gun.

== Legacy ==
George Phillpotts collected a number of Fijian and Tongan artefacts, possibly during HMS Hazard's South Sea cruises in 1843–44:

- Fijian paddle club. Accession no. E1248, Royal Albert Memorial Museum
- Fijian gadi or engraved one-handed club incised with whale-tooth stars at both ends. Accession no. E1605, Royal Albert Memorial Museum
- Fijian two handed club. Accession no. E1606 Royal Albert Memorial Museum
- Fijian club or battle-hammer carved in the form of a stylised flying fox fruit bat, Pteropus. Accession no. E1607, Royal Albert Memorial Museum
- Fijian i ula drisia or throwing club. Accession no. E1608, Royal Albert Memorial Museum
- Fijian i ula drisia or throwing club. Accession no. E1610, Royal Albert Memorial Museum
- Fijian i ula drisia or throwing club. Accession no. E1611, Royal Albert Memorial Museum
- Tongan kali hahapo or neck rest. Accession no. E1612, Royal Albert Memorial Museum
- Fijian sokilaki or long barbed spear. Accession no. E1616, Royal Albert Memorial Museum.

New Zealand artefacts collected 1844–1845:

- New Zealand flax fibre korowai or cloak. H 1200 x W 1700 mm. Accession no. E1620, Royal Albert Memorial Museum

== Arms of Phillpotts ==
Escutcheon—Gules a cross argent between four swords erect argent, pommels and hilts or. Crest—A dexter arm embowed in armour, holding in the hand a sword all proper.
