= Battle of Ōhaeawai =

1845 battle

- Part of Flagstaff War
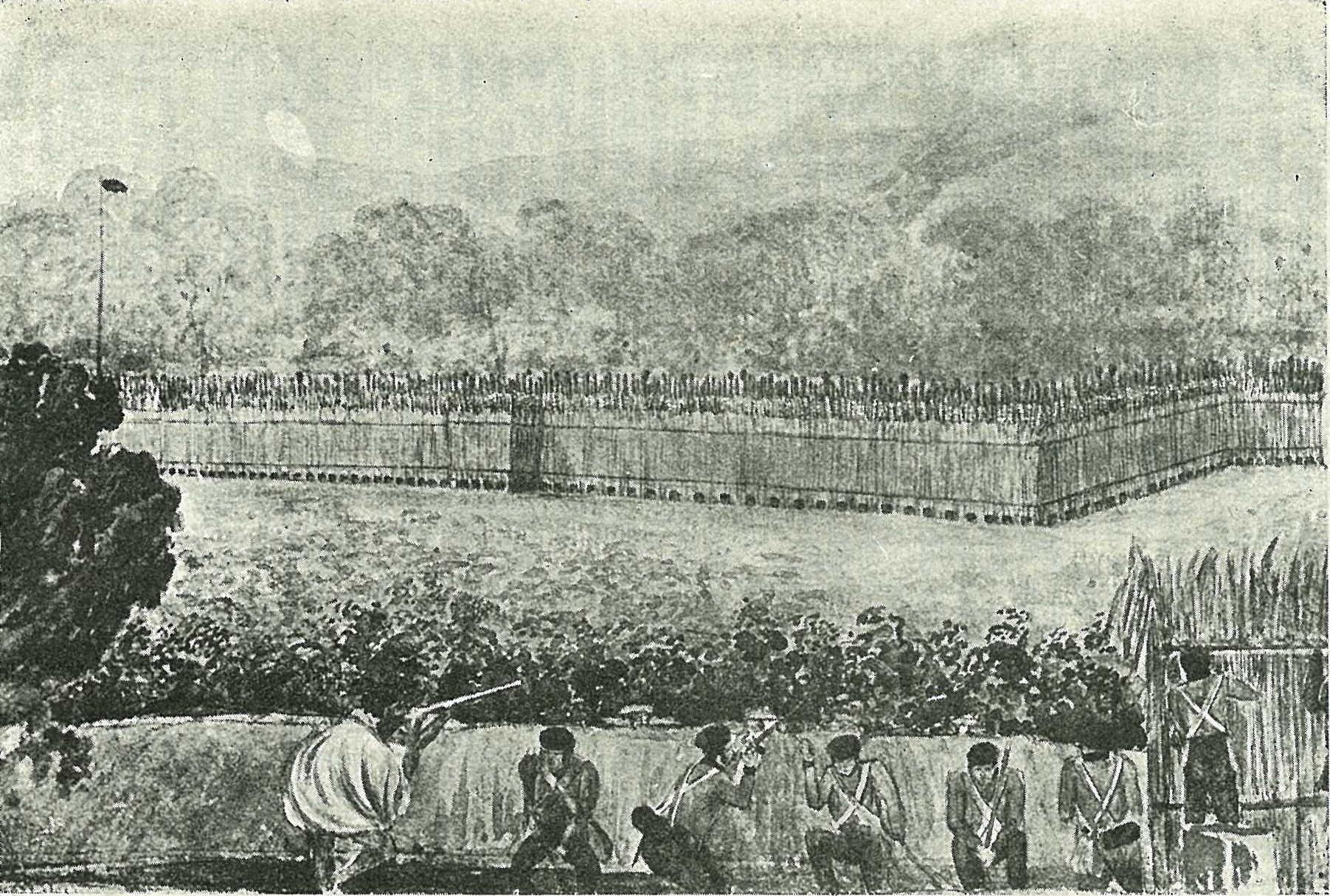
- The left angle of Ōhaeawai under siege, 1845. Artist: Cyprian Bridge, Major, 58th Regiment
Date	July 1845
Location	Ōhaeawai, New Zealand 35°22′39″S 173°51′16″E
Result	Inconclusive

Belligerents
(United Kingdom of Great Britain and Ireland) Col. of New Zealand (United Kingdom of Great Britain and Ireland) Loyalist Māori	Rebel Māori

Commanders and leaders
(United Kingdom of Great Britain and Ireland) Henry Despard (United Kingdom of Great Britain and Ireland) Tāmati Wāka Nene	Te Ruki Kawiti; Pene Taui

Units involved
(United Kingdom of Great Britain and Ireland) Royal Navy: HMS Hazard; (United Kingdom of Great Britain and Ireland) British Army: 58th Regiment; 96th Regiment; 99th Regiment; Ordnance: Royal Engineers; Royal Artillery; (United Kingdom of Great Britain and Ireland) Auckland militia: Volunteer Pioneers; (United Kingdom of Great Britain and Ireland) Maori Loyalists: Tāmati Wāka Nene; Eruera Maihi Patuone; Makoare Te Taonui; Mohi Tāwhai; Nōpera Panakareao; Repa	Taua: Te Ruki Kawiti; Pene Taui

Strength
Military; 630 officers & men Maori allies 250 warriors	Ōhaeawai; ~ 250 warriors

Casualties and losses
40–47 killed 70–73 wounded	10 killed or wounded

The Battle of Ōhaeawai, part of the Flagstaff War, was fought in July 1845 at Ōhaeawai in Northland, New Zealand. The battle was between British forces and their allies from the local Ngāpuhi tribe of Māori on one side, and other Ngāpuhi, led by Te Ruki Kawiti, a prominent rangatira (chief), on the other side. The battle was notable for establishing that an appropriately built fortified pā could withstand bombardment from cannon fire, with a frontal assault by soldiers suffering heavy casualties.

== Kawiti's success at Ōhaeawai Pā ==
After the Battle of Te Ahuahu a debate occurred between Te Ruki Kawiti and the Ngatirangi chief Pene Taui as to the site of the next battle; Kawiti eventually agreed to a request to fortify Pene Taui's pā, which was 4 km (2 mi) from the present settlement of Ōhaeawai and 6 km (4 mi) from Kaikohe. In the winter of 1845 Lieutenant Colonel Henry Despard led a combined force of troops from the 58th, 96th, and 99th Regiments, Royal Marines and Māori allies in an attack on Pene Taui's pā, which had been fortified by Kawiti.

The British troops arrived before the Ōhaeawai Pā on 23 June and established a camp about 500 metres (1,600 ft) away. On the summit of a nearby hill (Puketapu) they built a four-gun battery. They opened fire next day and continued until dark but did very little damage to the palisade. The next day the guns were brought to within 200 metres (660 ft) of the pā. The bombardment continued for another two days but still did very little damage. Partly this was due to the elasticity of the flax covering the palisade. Since the introduction of muskets the Māori had learnt to cover the outside of the palisades with layers of flax (Phormium tenax) leaves, making them effectively bulletproof as the velocity of musket balls was dissipated by the flax leaves. However the main fault of the bombardment was a failure to concentrate the cannon fire on one area of the defences, so as to create a breach in the palisade.

After two days of bombardment without effecting a breach, Despard ordered a frontal assault. He was, with difficulty, persuaded to postpone this pending the arrival of a 32-pound naval gun which came the next day, 1 July. However an unexpected sortie from the pā resulted in the temporary occupation of the knoll on which Tāmati Wāka Nene had his camp and the capture of Nene's colours—the Union Jack. The Union Jack was carried into the pā. There it was hoisted, upside down, and at half-mast high, below the Māori flag, which was a kākahu (Māori cloak). This insulting display of the Union Jack was the cause of the disaster which ensued. Infuriated by the insult to the Union Jack, Colonel Despard ordered an assault upon the pā the same day without waiting for the 32-pounder to arrive. The attack was directed to the section of the pā where the angle of the palisade allowed a double flank from which the defenders of the pā could fire at the attackers; the attack was a reckless endeavour.

The British persisted in their attempts to storm the unbreached palisades and five to seven minutes later around 40 British troops were killed with over 70 wounded. The casualties included Captain Grant of the 58th Regiment and Lieutenant George Phillpotts of HMS Hazard. The scalp of Lieutenant Phillpotts was brought to the tohunga Te Atua Wera, who made divinations and composed a song foretelling victory against the British. The casualties were buried at St. John the Baptist Church at Waimate North.

Shaken by the loss of a third of his troops, Despard decided to abandon the siege. However, his Māori allies contested this decision. Tāmati Wāka Nene persuaded Despard to wait for a few more days. More ammunition and supplies were brought in and the shelling continued. On the morning of 8 July the pā was found to have been abandoned, the occupants having disappeared in the night. When they had a chance to examine it, the British officers found it to be even stronger than they had feared.

The defenders of the pā had four iron cannons on ship-carriages including a carronade that was loaded with a bullock-chain, and fired at close quarters at the attacking soldiers. The colonial forces captured these cannons, one of which had been destroyed by a shot from a British cannon.

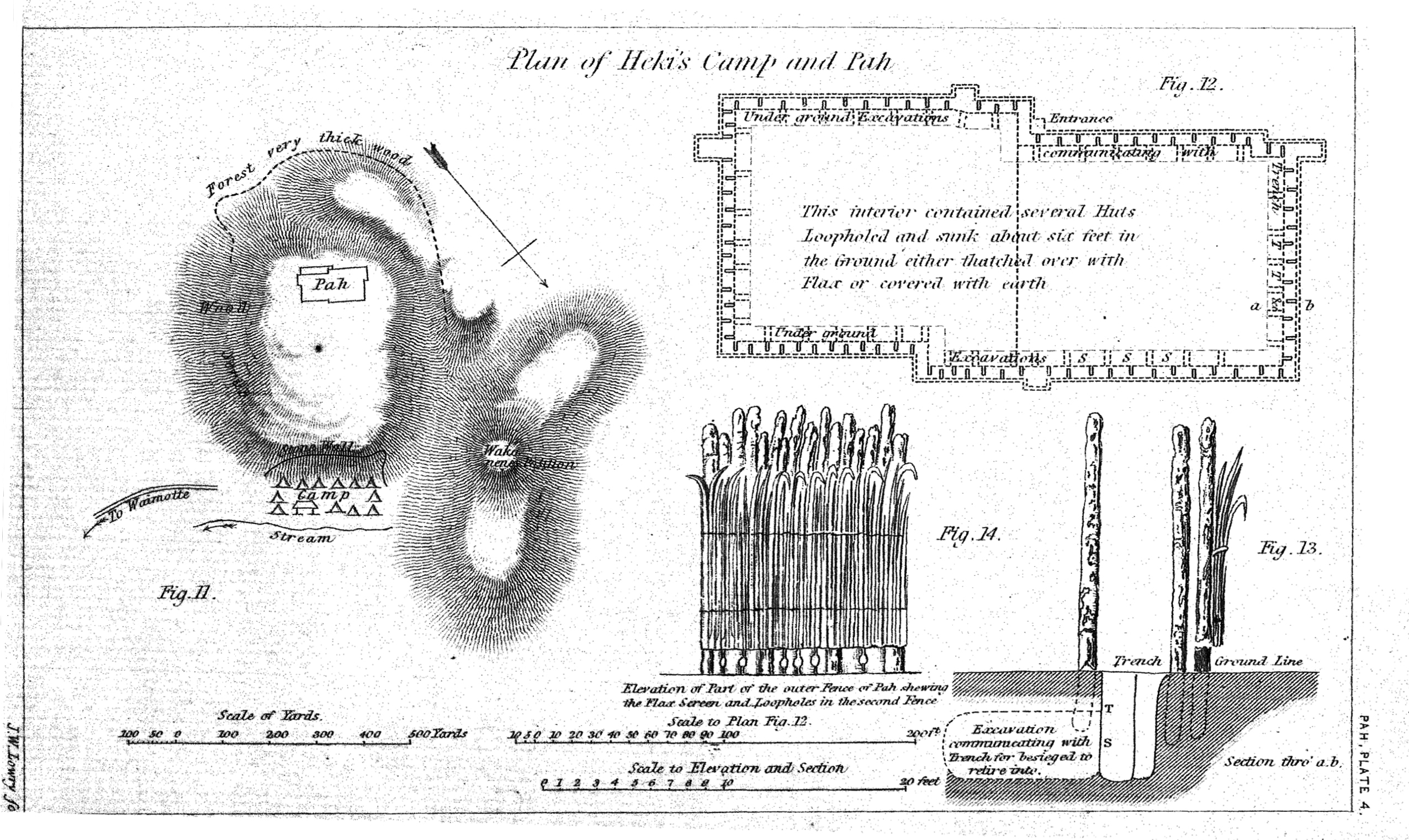
Captain Marlow's drawing, Plate IV, of Heke's camp and pā at Ōhaeawai, 1845

Captain William Biddlecomb Marlow, RE, noted in relation to his drawing, Plate IV, of Ōhaeawai pā:

The dotted lines denote rows of fences composed of trees deeply sunk in the ground, between 9 and 15 inches thick, bound close together by a strong native line or rope at the top and bottom: upon the outer row of trees a screen between 4 and 6 inches thick, and 8 and 9 feet high, was formed from a native plant called the New Zealand flax, which is exceedingly tough, and at a distance capable of resisting a musket-ball.

This screen was kept about 18 inches above the ground, to serve as loop-holes to fire through from the trench marked T T, Plate IV., figs. 13 and 14; S S serving as traverses.

Ensign John Jermyn Symonds, 99th Regiment, described in his drawing that Ōhaeawai's inner palisade was 3 metres (9.8 ft) high, built using puriri logs. In front of the inner palisade was a ditch in which the warriors could shelter and reload their muskets then fire through gaps in the two outer palisades.

Relying on the report of her husband Henry who observed the battle, Marianne Williams commented on the ingenuity of the construction of the war pā in a letter to Mrs. Heathcote, 5 July 1845:

It is quite astonishing how they seem to defy the British in their fortifications. They have double fences, ditches, and loop holes, their houses sunk underground; and as the great guns of the British are fired through their pa with so little loss to the rebels, it is supposed that they have large holes, in which they secure themselves. The fence round the pa is covered between every paling with loose bunches of flax, against which the bullets fall and drop; in the night they repair every hole made by the guns.

The pā was duly destroyed and the British retreated once again to the Bay of Islands. Te Ruki Kawiti and his warriors escaped and proceeded to construct an even stronger pā at Ruapekapeka. The Battle of Ōhaeawai was presented as a victory for the British force, notwithstanding the death of about a third of the soldiers. The reality of the end of the Battle of Ōhaeawai was that Kawiti and his warriors had abandoned the pā in a tactical withdrawal, with the Ngāpuhi moving on to build the Ruapekapeka Pā from which to engage the British force on a battle field chosen by Kawiti.

Hōne Heke did not participate in the Battle of Ōhaeawai as he was recovering from the wounds he received at the Battle of Te Ahuahu.

== Model for the gunfighter pā ==
After the battle, models were made of the design of the pā, with one being sent to Britain where it sat forgotten in a museum. Other Māori tribes of New Zealand became aware of the techniques used in the design of the Ōhaeawai Pā in order to blunt the effectiveness of cannon and musket fire and to create firing trenches located within the inner palisade and communication trenches linking to ruas—shelters dug into the ground and covered with earth. The design of the Ōhaeawai Pā, and the pā subsequently built by Kawiti at Ruapekapeka, became the basis of what is now called the "gunfighter pā".

== Site of the battle ==
Saint Michael's Anglican Church was built on the site of the Ōhaeawai pā in 1871. While the area is now called Ngawha, it was known as Ōhaeawai at the time. James Cowan identified that "the site of the Ōhaeawai pā is now occupied by a Maori church and burying-ground. The scene of the battle is five miles from Kaikohe and two miles from the Township of Ōhaeawai. A Maori church of old-fashioned design is seen on the left as one travels from Kaikohe; it stands on a gentle rise a short distance west of the main road. The locality is usually called Ngawha, from the hot springs in the neighbourhood, but it is the true Ōhaeawai; the European township which has appropriated the name should properly be known as Taiamai. The church occupies the centre of the olden fortification, and a scoria-stone wall, 7 ft. high, encloses the sacred ground."

The soldiers and sailors' memorial stands in the churchyard. The Maori inscription reads, with translation:

Ko te tohu tapu tenei o nga hoia me nga heremana o te Kuini i hinga i te whawhai ki konei ki Ohaeawai i te tau o to tatou ariki 1845. Ko tenei urupa na nga Maori i whaka-takoto I muri iho i te maunga rongo.

This is a sacred memorial to the soldiers and sailors of the Queen who fell in battle here at Ohaeawai in the year of Our Lord 1845. This burying place was laid out by the Maoris after the making of peace.

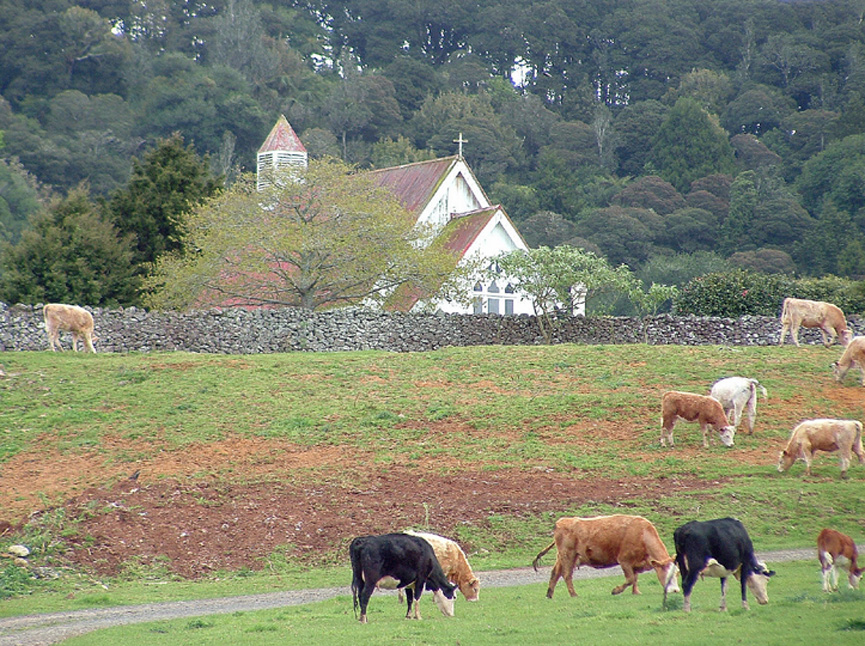
Saint Michael's Anglican Church sits atop Ōhaeawai pā site today in a pastoral setting

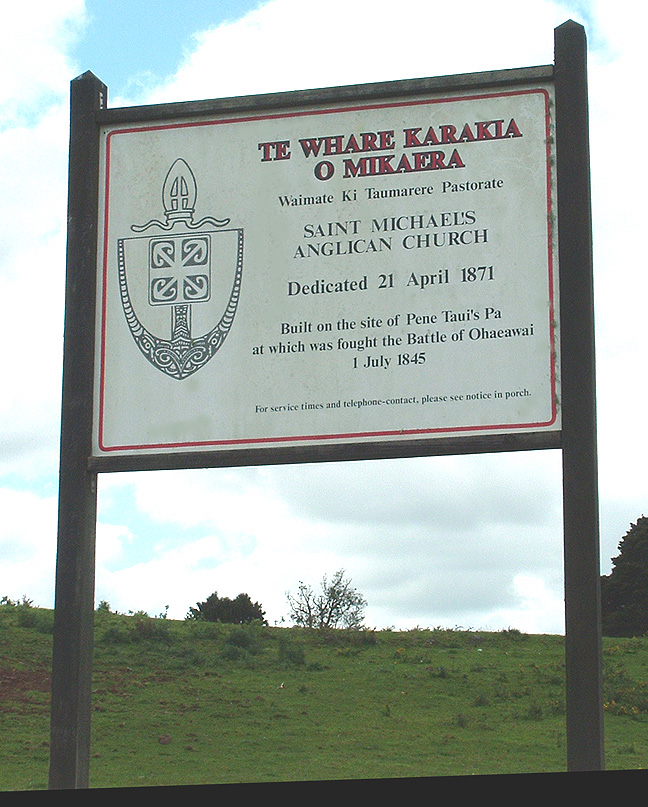
Saint Michael's sign, 2006

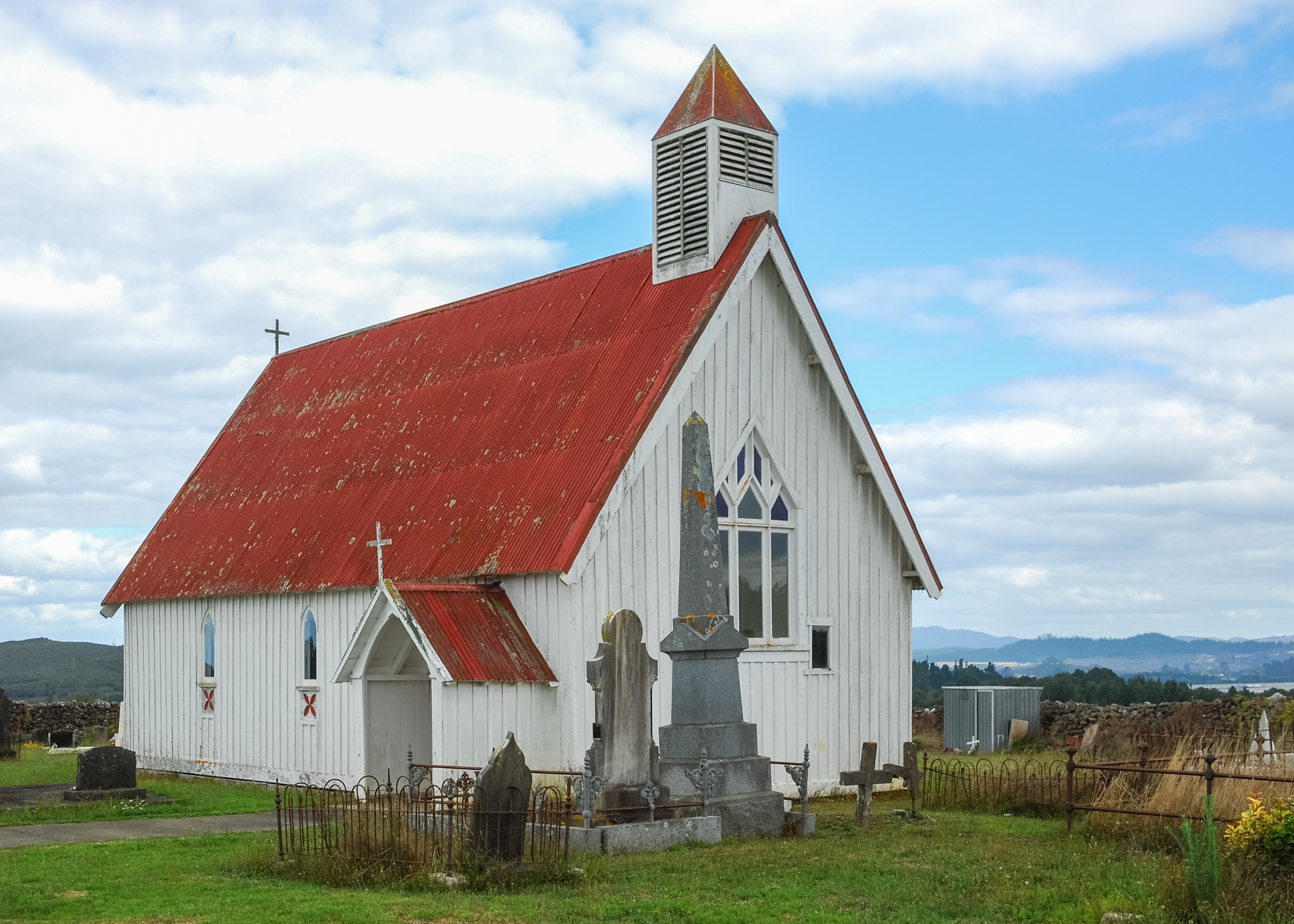
Saint Michael's Anglican Church, 2010

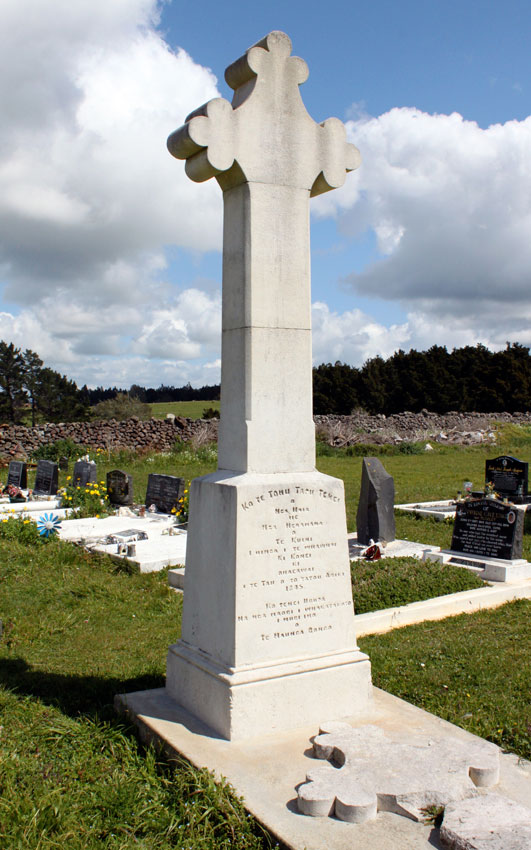
The memorial in the churchyard

== See also ==
- New Zealand wars
- Pakaraka

== Sources ==
- Belich, James (1988). The New Zealand Wars: And the Victorian Interpretation of Racial Conflict. Penguin. ISBN 9780140111620.
- Carleton, Hugh (1874). The Life of Henry Williams. Vol. 2 – via Early New Zealand Books (ENZB), University of Auckland Library.
- Cowan, James (1922). The New Zealand Wars: A History of the Maori Campaigns and the Pioneering Period. Vol. 1, 1845–1864. Wellington: R.E. Owen.
- Kawiti, Tawai (October 1956). "Heke's War in the North". Te Ao Hou / The New World (16): 38–46 – via National Library of New Zealand Library.
