= Charles Hood =

British Army officer

Lieutenant-General Charles Hood
- Born: 1826
- Died: 8 February 1883 (aged 56–57)
- Military career
- Allegiance: United Kingdom
- Service: British Army
- Service years: 1844–1870
- Rank: Lieutenant-General
- Conflicts: Crimean War; Siege of Sebastopol (WIA)

Charles Hood (1826–1883) was an English officer in the British Army. He led the ladder party in the attack on the Redan in October 1855 and commanded the Buffs on entry into Sebastopol during the Crimean War, and as lieutenant-colonel commanded the 58th Foot in Bengal. He became a major-general in 1870 and an honorary lieutenant-general in 1877.

== Life ==
Charles Hood, born in 1826, was educated at the Royal Military College, Sandhurst, and obtained an ensigncy by purchase in the 3rd Buffs, 26 June 1844. In 1846 he acted as secretary to the mission sent to the Argentine Republic to arrange certain differences between the combined powers of Great Britain and France and General Rosas, governor of Buenos Ayres. He became lieutenant in the Buffs in 1846, and captain in 1851.

Hood arrived in the Crimea in May 1855. He was senior officer of his regiment in the trenches before Sebastopol, and led the ladder party in the attack of the Redan on 8 October 1855. In both engagements he was wounded. He was in command of the regiment from 13 September to 27 December 1855, and was at its head when it marched with colours flying into the Karabelnaia suburb after the fall of the city, these being the first British colours carried within Sebastopol. Hood was rewarded with a brevet of major, English and Turkish medals, and fifth class of Medjidie.

After serving as major of the depôt battalion at Templemore, Hood became lieutenant-colonel 58th Foot on 23 November 1860, and for some years commanded that regiment in Bengal. He became a major-general in 1870, and honorary lieutenant-general (retired list) in 1877. He died at his home, 29 Belsize Road, Hampstead, London, on 8 February 1883.

== Honours ==
- Order of the Medjidie (fifth class)
- Crimea Medal
- Turkish Crimea Medal

== Sources ==
- Chichester, H. M.; May, Alex (2004). "Hood, Charles (1826–1883), army officer". Oxford Dictionary of National Biography (online ed.). Oxford University Press. doi:10.1093/ref:odnb/13672. (Subscription, Wikipedia Library access or UK public library membership required.)

Attribution:

- This article incorporates text from a publication now in the public domain: Chichester, Henry Manners (1891). "Hood, Francis Grosvenor". In Lee, Sidney (ed.). Dictionary of National Biography. Vol. 27. London: Smith, Elder & Co. p. 256.
