= Waitangi, Northland =

Locality in the Bay of Islands, North Island, New Zealand

Waitangi
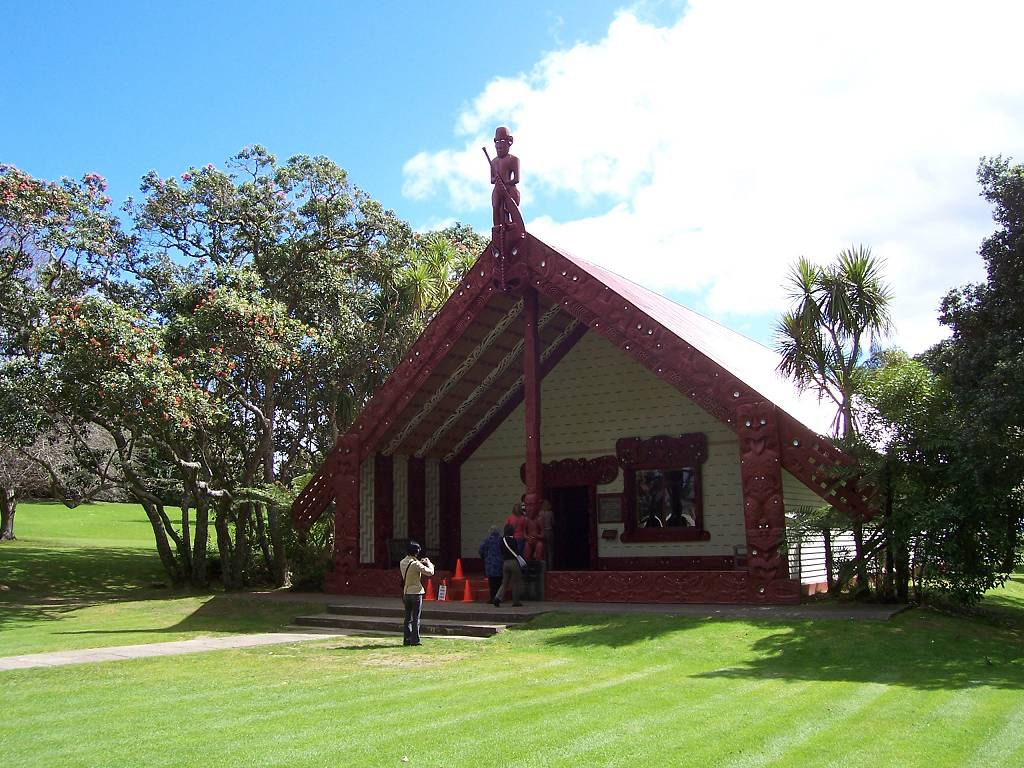
- Te Whare Rūnanga, the carved meeting house on the Waitangi Treaty Grounds
- Interactive map of Waitangi
- Coordinates: 35°15′58″S 174°4′48″E
- Country: New Zealand
- Region: Northland Region
- District: Far North District
- Ward: Bay of Islands-Whangaroa
- Community: Bay of Islands-Whangaroa
- Subdivision: Paihia
- Electorates: Northland; Te Tai Tokerau

Government
  - Territorial Authority: Far North District Council
  - Regional council: Northland Regional Council
  - Mayor of the Far North: Moko Tepania
  - Northland MP: Grant McCallum
  - Te Tai Tokerau MP: Mariameno Kapa-Kingi

Area
  - Total: 17.19 km^{2} (6.64 sq mi)

Population (June 2025)
  - Total: 60
  - Density: 3.5/km^{2} (9.0/sq mi)

Waitangi (Note: /ˈwaɪtɑːŋi/ WY-tahng-ee or /waɪˈtæŋi/ wy-TANG-ee; Māori: [ˈwaitaŋi]) is a locality on the north side of the Waitangi River in the Bay of Islands, 60 kilometres (37 miles) north of Whangārei, on the North Island of New Zealand. Here, two documents pivotal to New Zealand history were signed: the Declaration of Independence of New Zealand, on 28 October 1835, and the Treaty of Waitangi, on 6 February 1840.

Waitangi is close to the town of Paihia, to which it is connected by a bridge near the mouth of the Waitangi River estuary. While Statistics New Zealand and NZ Post consider the southern boundary of Waitangi to be the river and estuary, with the area further south being part of Paihia, the area by Te Tī Bay, immediately south of the river, is sometimes referred to as part of Waitangi.

== Etymology ==
"Waitangi" is a Māori-language name meaning "noisy waters" or "weeping waters", probably referring to the Haruru Falls on the Waitangi River.

== History ==
=== Signing of Treaty of Waitangi ===
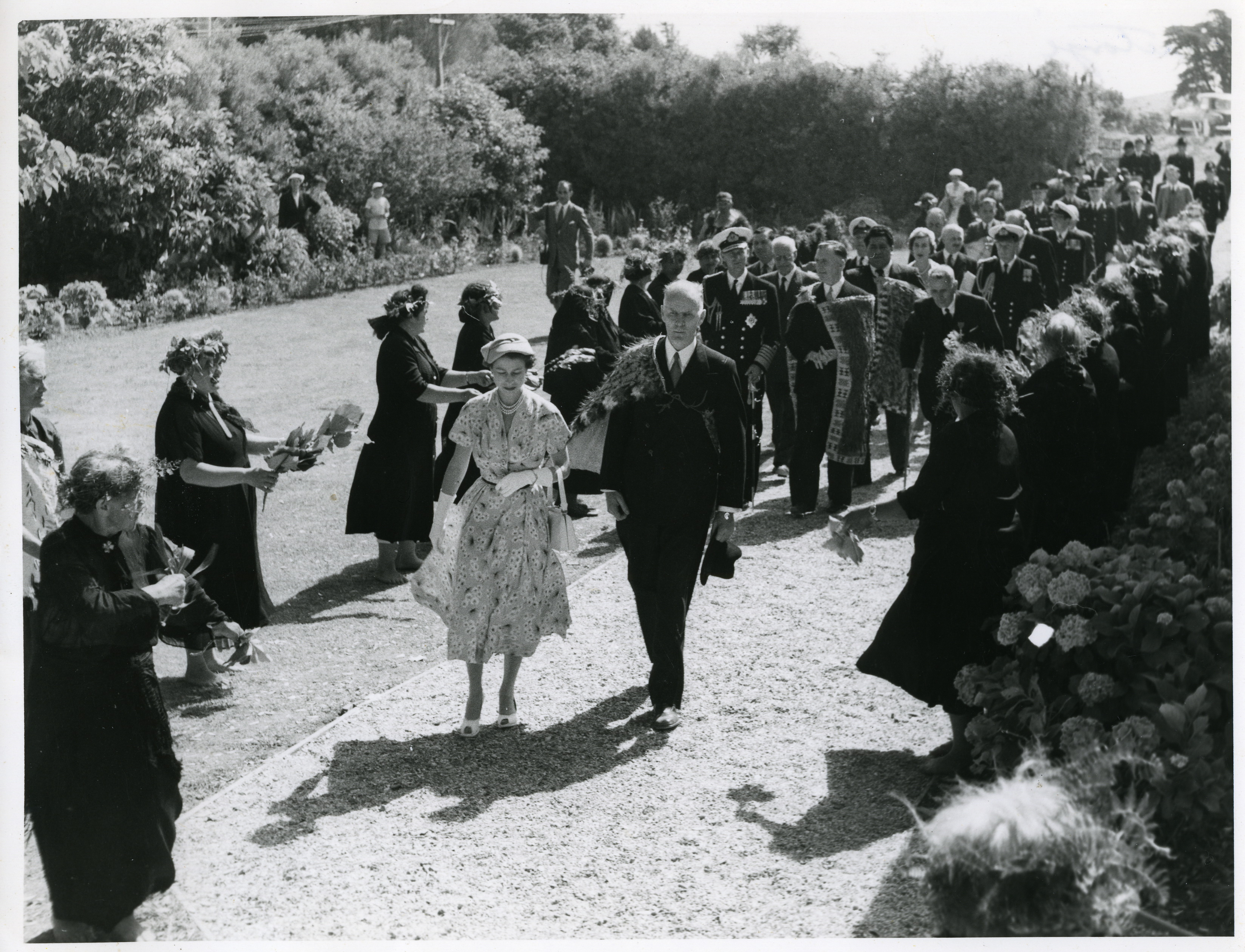
Elizabeth II in Waitangi, December 1953

The Treaty of Waitangi proper began on 5 February 1840 when a public meeting was held on the grounds in front of James Busby's residence. Lieutenant Governor Hobson read a proposed document to the 300 or so European and Māori who were in attendance and then provided the Māori chiefs an opportunity to speak. Initially, a large number of chiefs (including Te Kemara, Rewa and Moka Te Kainga-mataa) spoke against accepting the Crown's proposition to rule over Aotearoa. Later in the proceedings a few chiefs began to entertain the idea; amongst the more notable chiefs to support the Crown were Te Wharerahi, Pumuka, and the two Hokianga chiefs, Tāmati Wāka Nene and his brother Eruera Maihi Patuone.

The proceedings were ended and were to recommence on 7 February; however, a number of chiefs pressed to sign earlier. The Treaty of Waitangi was initially signed on 6 February 1840 in a marquee erected in the grounds of James Busby's house at Waitangi by representatives of the British Crown, the chiefs of the Confederation of the United Tribes of New Zealand, and other Māori tribal leaders, and subsequently by other Māori chiefs at other places in New Zealand. Not all of the chiefs chose to sign this document, with a number of chiefs either delaying or refusing to put pen to paper.

In 2007, researcher Brent Kerehona claimed that uncertainty has arisen over whether Ngapuhi chief Moka Te Kainga-mataa actually signed; despite his name appearing on this document. A close inspection of the Treaty document itself shows no evidence of a signature or 'mark' next to Moka's name (which is written as 'Te Tohu o Moka'). Kerehona elaborates by inferring that it is clear by the accounts of Colenso (1890) that not only did Moka clearly express his concerns about the Treaty's effects whilst at the meeting on February 5, but that the discussion that he had with the Reverend Charles Baker, combined with Moka's final comment, should be taken into account.

The Treaty of Waitangi followed on from The Declaration of Independence (He Whakaputanga) but did not render it void.

== Treaty Grounds ==
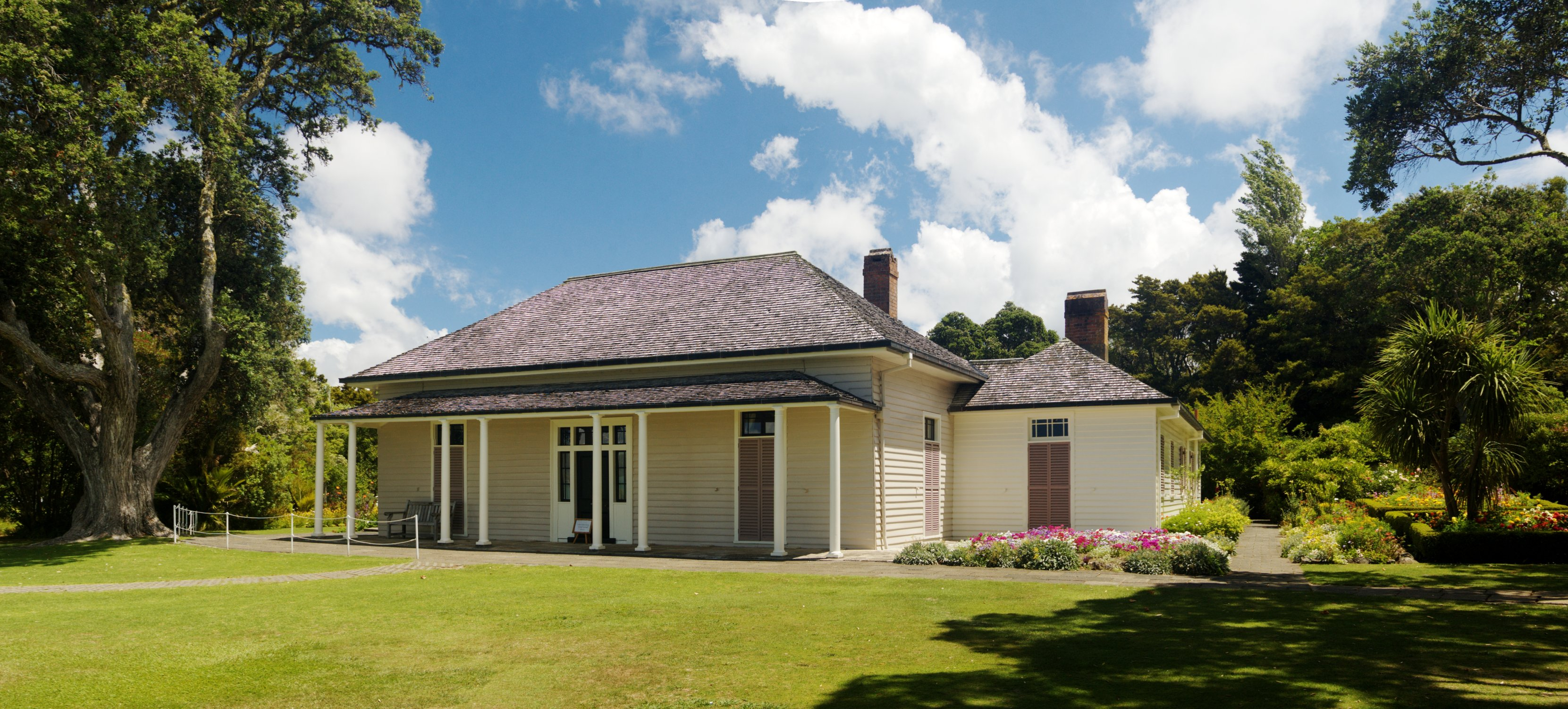
James Busby's house at Waitangi

Waitangi Treaty Grounds has been open to the public since 1934. What is now called the 'Treaty House' was first occupied by James Busby, who acted as the British resident in New Zealand from 1832 until the arrival of William Hobson, and his wife Agnes Busby. The Treaty House was restored in the 1930s, in preparation for New Zealand Centenary in 1940, sparking the first emergence of the Treaty into Pākehā attention since the 19th century.

Te Whare Rūnanga, a carved Māori meeting house, completed its construction near the Treaty House in 1939 and opened on 6 February 1940. The area of the whare is sometimes used as if it is a marae and referred to as the "upper marae", although it is not a true marae, but a whare whakairo (carved meeting house). There is a marae, Te Tii Waitangi, in Te Tī Bay on the south side of the Waitangi River that is sometimes referred to as the "lower marae".

Te Kōngahu Museum of Waitangi opened on the grounds in 2016. Another museum, Te Rau Aroha Museum of the Price of Citizenship, opened in 2020.

In early November 2024, the Sixth National Government allocated NZ$10.2 million from the Regional Infrastructure Fund for building upgrades and repairs at the Waitangi Treaty Grounds.

== Wharf ==
The Waitangi Wharf is at the mouth of the Waitangi River estuary, and is used by passenger ferry services between Russell and Paihia. In 1990, artist Selwyn Muru requisitioned copper from the historic wharf piles, and incorporated these into Waharoa, a sculpture located in Aotea Square, Auckland.

== Demographics ==
Statistics New Zealand describes Waitangi as a rural settlement. It covers 17.19 km^{2} (6.64 sq mi) and had an estimated population of 60 as of June 2025, with a population density of 3.5 people per km^{2}. The settlement is part of the larger Puketona-Waitangi statistical area.

Historical population
Year	Pop.	±% p.a.
2006	72	—
2013	66	−1.24%
2018	51	−5.03%
2023	57	+2.25%

Waitangi had a population of 57 in the 2023 New Zealand census, an increase of 6 people (11.8%) since the 2018 census, and a decrease of 9 people (−13.6%) since the 2013 census. There were 39 males and 21 females in 39 dwellings. 10.5% of people identified as LGBTIQ+. The median age was 33.8 years (compared with 38.1 years nationally). There were 9 people (15.8%) aged under 15 years, 12 (21.1%) aged 15 to 29, 24 (42.1%) aged 30 to 64, and 12 (21.1%) aged 65 or older.

People could identify as more than one ethnicity. The results were 73.7% European (Pākehā), 15.8% Māori, and 15.8% Asian. English was spoken by 100.0%, and other languages by 21.1%. New Zealand Sign Language was known by 5.3%. The percentage of people born overseas was 26.3, compared with 28.8% nationally.

Religious affiliations were 26.3% Christian, 5.3% Hindu, 5.3% Māori religious beliefs, and 5.3% Buddhist. People who answered that they had no religion were 57.9%, and 10.5% of people did not answer the census question.

Of those at least 15 years old, 15 (31.2%) people had a bachelor's or higher degree, 24 (50.0%) had a post-high school certificate or diploma, and 6 (12.5%) people exclusively held high school qualifications. The median income was $42,000, compared with $41,500 nationally. 3 people (6.2%) earned over $100,000 compared to 12.1% nationally. The employment status of those at least 15 was that 33 (68.8%) people were employed full-time, and 6 (12.5%) were part-time.

== Climate ==
Climate data for Waitangi (1981–2010)
Month	Jan	Feb	Mar	Apr	May	Jun	Jul	Aug	Sep	Oct	Nov	Dec	Year
Mean daily maximum °C (°F)	24.2 (75.6)	24.3 (75.7)	23.1 (73.6)	20.7 (69.3)	18.8 (65.8)	16.6 (61.9)	15.9 (60.6)	16.1 (61.0)	17.7 (63.9)	19.1 (66.4)	20.4 (68.7)	22.8 (73.0)	20.0 (68.0)
Daily mean °C (°F)	19.4 (66.9)	20.0 (68.0)	18.7 (65.7)	16.5 (61.7)	14.8 (58.6)	12.3 (54.1)	11.6 (52.9)	12.0 (53.6)	13.4 (56.1)	14.5 (58.1)	15.9 (60.6)	18.2 (64.8)	15.6 (60.1)
Mean daily minimum °C (°F)	14.7 (58.5)	15.8 (60.4)	14.3 (57.7)	12.3 (54.1)	10.8 (51.4)	7.9 (46.2)	7.2 (45.0)	7.8 (46.0)	9.0 (48.2)	10.0 (50.0)	11.4 (52.5)	13.6 (56.5)	11.2 (52.2)
Average rainfall mm (inches)	84.9 (3.34)	125.5 (4.94)	169.4 (6.67)	120.7 (4.75)	95.3 (3.75)	140.3 (5.52)	134.5 (5.30)	119.1 (4.69)	133.5 (5.26)	115.4 (4.54)	97.6 (3.84)	88.0 (3.46)	1,424.2 (56.06)
Mean monthly sunshine hours	229.4	176.8	163.5	148.4	145.6	112.9	142.5	142.2	161.5	206.8	174.6	199.9	2,004.1
Source: NIWA
