= Tapua =

Māori chief

Tapua (c. 1730–1800) was a Māori rangatira, arikinui (senior chief) of the Ngāti Hao hapū, of what became the Ngāpuhi confederation.

His base was the Kaikohe and nearby Hokianga area of northern Aotearoa (New Zealand). Tapua was also the tohunga of Ngāti Hao and famed as a great warrior in the tradition of the fighting rangatira (chiefs) of Ngāpuhi.

Tapua saw James Cook's ship when it visited in 1769, becoming one of the first Māori people to have contact with Europeans.

== Descent ==
Tapua's father was Takare and his mother, Ripia, a tohunga in her own right and one of the powerful women of Ngāpuhi. Although he traced descent directly from Rahiri and Rahiri's first-born son Uenuku, his whakapapa (genealogical connections) were also strongly with the Pewhairangi (Bay of Islands) area where he maintained a pā at Okura, a reach of the Kerikeri inlet.

== Wife and children ==
Tapua's wife was Te Kawehau who also traced descent directly from Rahiri through Kaharau, the second-born son of Rahiri. Their children were Tari, Te Anga, Te Ruanui, Patuone and Nene.

Tari married the Pewhairangi chief Te Wharerahi while Te Anga and Te Ruanui were killed in battle, fighting with Tapua against Ngati Pou. It was thus that Patuone inherited the male leadership of the family and hapu.
