= Hōne Heke =

New Zealand Māori chief (died 1850)

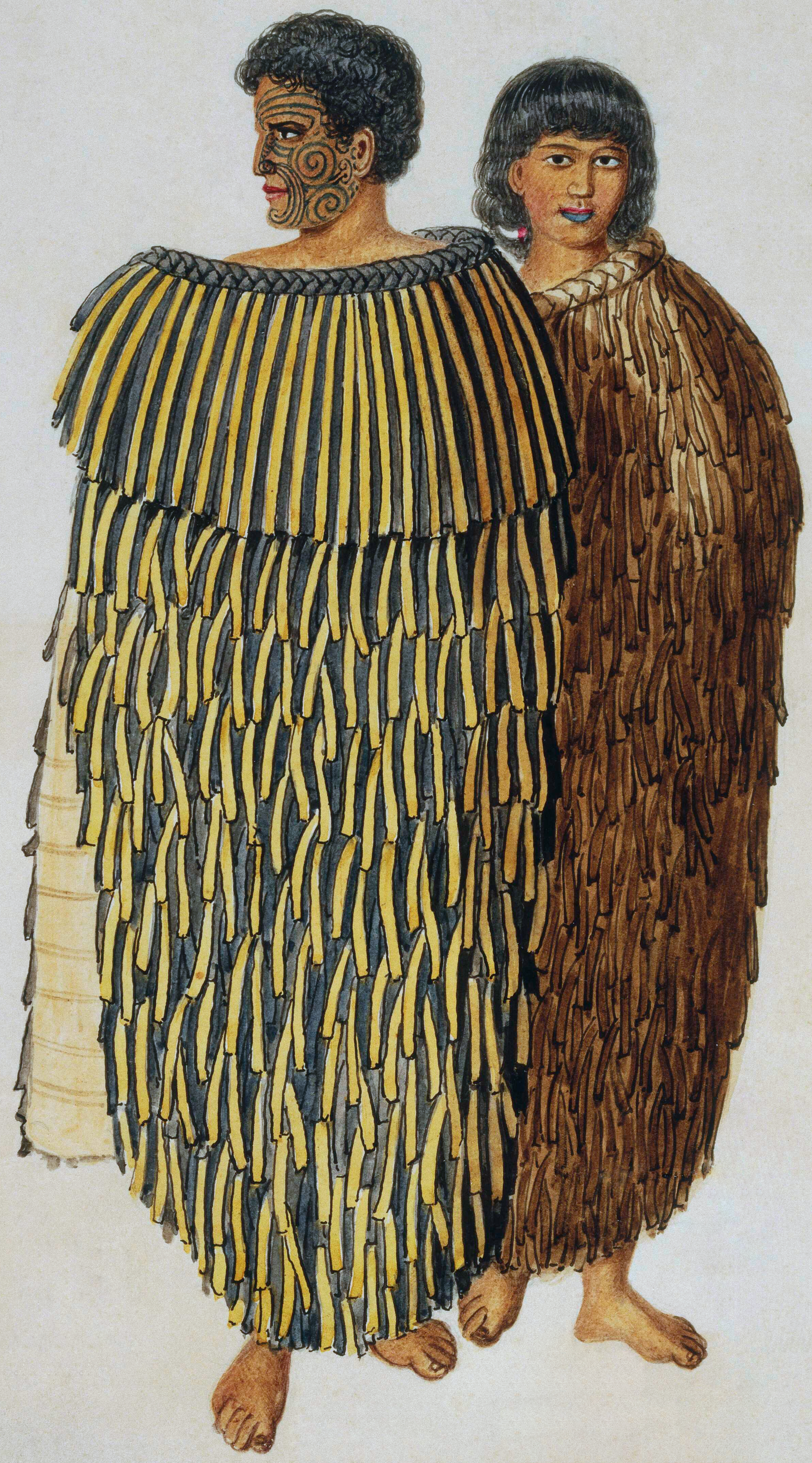
- Hōne Heke and his wife Hariata, circa 1845
- Born: Heke Pōkai c. 1807; Pakaraka, New Zealand
- Died: 7 August 1850; Kaikohe, New Zealand
- Burial place: Holy Trinity Church, Pakaraka
- Military career
- Allegiance: Ngāpuhi
- Conflicts: Musket Wars; Flagstaff War

Hōne Wiremu Heke Pōkai (c. 1807 – 7 August 1850), born Heke Pōkai and later often referred to as Hōne Heke, was a highly influential Māori rangatira (chief) of the Ngāpuhi iwi (tribe) and a war leader in northern New Zealand; he was affiliated with the Ngati Rahiri, Ngai Tawake, Ngati Tautahi, Te Matarahurahu and Te Uri-o-Hua hapū (subtribes) of Ngāpuhi. Hōne Heke fought with Hongi Hika, an earlier war leader of the Ngāpuhi, in the Musket Wars. Hōne Heke is considered the principal instigator of the Flagstaff War in 1845–46.

== Biography ==
Heke was born at Pakaraka, south of Kerikeri in the Bay of Islands, in 1807. His father was Tupanapana and his mother Te Kona. He was named Heke Pōkai, after his mother's brother Pokaia. He grew up in the Kaikohe area. As a youth, he attended the Church Missionary Society school at Kerikeri in 1824 and 1825 and came under the influence of the missionary Henry Williams. Subsequently, he, his first wife Ono (daughter of Te Pahi) and their two infant children were converted to Christianity. He and his wife were baptised on 9 August 1835, Heke Pōkai taking the Christian names Hoani or Hōne and Wiremu, and Ono taking the name Riria (Lydia). Hōne Heke became a lay preacher in the Anglican church. Riria and the children died soon after and Heke married Hariata (Harriet) Rongo, daughter of Hongi Hika, in the Kerikeri chapel on 30 March 1837.

Despite becoming a Christian, it was as a warrior and as a leader of a Māori rebellion that Hōne Heke is best known. He took part in the fighting on the beach at Kororareka in 1830 that is known as the Girls' War. After that fighting he participated in Tītore's expeditions to Tauranga in 1832 & 1833, and he fought with Tītore against Whiria (Pōmare II) in 1837.

== Treaty of Waitangi ==
Prior to the signing of the Treaty of Waitangi, Heke was one of the rangatira who signed He Whakaputanga. Conflicting reports survive as to when Heke signed the Treaty of Waitangi. He may have signed the Waitangi sheet with the other chiefs on 6 February 1840 (and in fact may have been the first rangatira to sign), but in any event, he soon found the agreement not to his liking. Among other things, Heke objected to the relocation of the capital to Auckland; moreover the Governor-in-Council imposed a customs tariff on staple articles of trade that resulted in a dramatic fall in the number of whaling ships that visited Kororāreka (over 20 whaling ships could anchor in the bay at any time); a reduction in the number of visiting ships caused a serious loss of revenue to Ngāpuhi. Heke and his cousin Tītore also collected and divided a levy of £5 on each ship entering the bay. Pōmare II also felt aggrieved that he could no longer collect payment from American whaling and sealing ships that called at Otuihu across from Opua.

The British representative became concerned that Heke and the Ngāpuhi chief Pōmare II flew the American Ensign. Heke and Pomare II had listened to Captain William Mayhew, the Acting-Consul for the United States since 1840, and to other Americans talking about the successful revolt of the American colonies against England over the issue of taxation. Heke obtained an American ensign from Henry Green Smith, a storekeeper at Wahapu who had succeeded Mayhew as Acting-Consul. After the flagstaff was cut down for a second time the Stars and Stripes flew from the carved sternpost of Heke's war-canoe. Letters from William Williams record talks he had with Heke, and refer to American traders attempting to undermine the British both before and especially after the signing of the treaty. William Mayhew left New Zealand and Green Smith and Charles Berry Waetford then acted as unofficial American Consuls. They continued in anti-British activities, selling muskets and powder to the disaffected Māori. Waetford was later convicted and imprisoned for gunrunning, but Green Smith successfully escaped New Zealand before the Crown could arrest him.

Bishop Pompallier, who led the Roman Catholic missionaries, had advised several of the leading Catholic chiefs (such as Rewa and Te Kemara) to be very wary in signing the treaty, so it is not surprising that they had spoken out against the treaty. William Colenso, the CMS missionary printer, in his record of the events of the signing of the Treaty of Waitangi commented that "After some little time Te Kemara came towards the table and affixed his sign to the parchment, stating that the Roman Catholic bishop (who had left the meeting before any of the chiefs had signed) had told him not to "write on the paper, for if he did he would be made a slave."

Following the signing of the treaty the British regarded the authority of the chiefs as subservient to that of the Crown; an interpretation which is not actually written in the Treaty of Waitangi and has not born out in the courts since, as the governor asserted the rule of law, the presence of government officials and troops had resulted in an end to the free-wheeling lawless situation that had prevailed in the North since the 1820s.

== Events leading to the outbreak of the Flagstaff War ==
Other matters also caused dissatisfaction among the Ngāpuhi. One item involved the shifting of the capital of the new colony from Okiato to Auckland in 1841. Auckland had experienced a significant economic boom with the discovery of copper at Kawau island. In 1844/45 the copper was worth 7000 pounds, about a third of Auckland's total exports for that period of time. This resulted in a loss of revenue for the people of the Bay of Islands. Furthermore, the imposition of government customs duties, the temporary ban on the felling of kauri trees, and the government control over the sale of land all contributed to an economic depression for the northern Māori.

The trial and execution of Wiremu Kīngi Maketū in 1842 for murder was, in the opinion of Archdeacon Henry Williams, the beginning of Heke's antagonism to the colonial administration, as Heke began gathering support among the Ngāpuhi for a rebellion against the colonial administration. However it was not until 1844 that Heke sought the support of Te Ruki Kawiti and other leaders of the Ngāpuhi iwi by the conveying of ‘te ngākau’, the custom observed by those who sought help to settle a tribal grievance.

On 8 July 1844 the flagstaff on Maiki Hill at the north end of Kororareka was cut down for the first time by Heke's ally Te Haratua, the chief of Pakaraka. Heke himself had set out to cut down the flagstaff, but had been persuaded by Archdeacon William Williams not to do so. As a signal of his unhappiness with the British, and encouraged by the American traders, in the space of six months Hōne Heke returned to chop the flagpole down three times. Heke had been strongly influenced by stories of the American War of Independence.

== Battle of Kororāreka ==
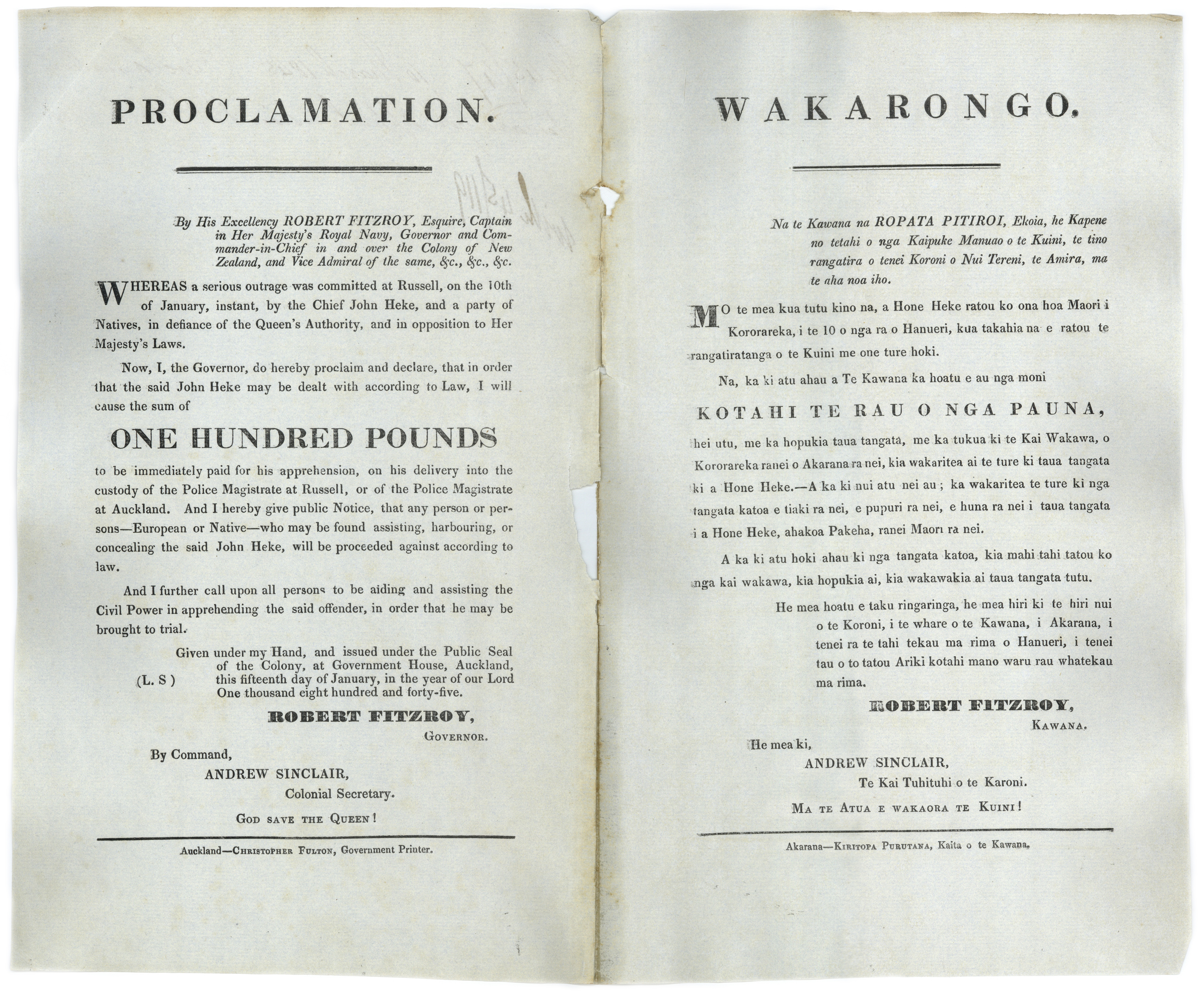
Hōne Heke Wanted Poster (1845)

The uprising began when the flagpole was cut down for the fourth time at dawn on Tuesday 11 March 1845. A force of about 600 Māori armed with muskets, double-barrelled guns and tomahawks attacked Kororareka. Heke's warriors attacked the guard post, killing all the defenders, and Heke cut down the flagstaff. At the same time, possibly as a diversion, Te Ruki Kawiti and his men attacked the town of Kororareka. The survivors from the 250 soldiers and settlers abandoned the town as HMS Hazard bombarded Heke's warriors with cannon. Heke's men then raided the town taking anything useful they could find. Heke's order that the southern part of Korororeka remain untouched resulted in the Anglican and Catholic churches being undamaged.

Many Māori under the mana of the leading northern rangitira, Tāmati Wāka Nene, stayed loyal to the British government. They took an active part in the fight against Heke and tried to maintain a dialogue with the rebels in an effort to bring peace.

== Heke and Nene skirmishes ==
After the attack on Kororareka, Heke and Kawiti and the warriors travelled inland to Lake Ōmāpere near to Kaikohe some 20 miles (32 km), or two days travel, from the Bay of Islands. Nene built a pā close to Lake Ōmāpere. Heke's pā, named Puketutu, was 2 miles (3.2 km) away, while it is sometimes named as "Te Mawhe", however the hill of that name is some distance to the north-east. In April 1845, during the time that the colonial forces were gathering in the Bay of Islands, the warriors of Heke and Nene fought many skirmishes on the small hill named Taumata-Karamu that was between the two pās, and on open country between Okaihau and Te Ahuahu. Heke's force numbered about three hundred men; Kawiti joined Heke towards the end of April with another hundred and fifty warriors. Opposing Heke and Kawiti were about four hundred warriors that supported Tamati Waka Nene, including the chiefs Makoare Te Taonui and his son Aperahama Taonui, Mohi Tawhai, Arama Karaka Pi and Nōpera Panakareao.

== Attack on Heke's Pā at Puketutu ==
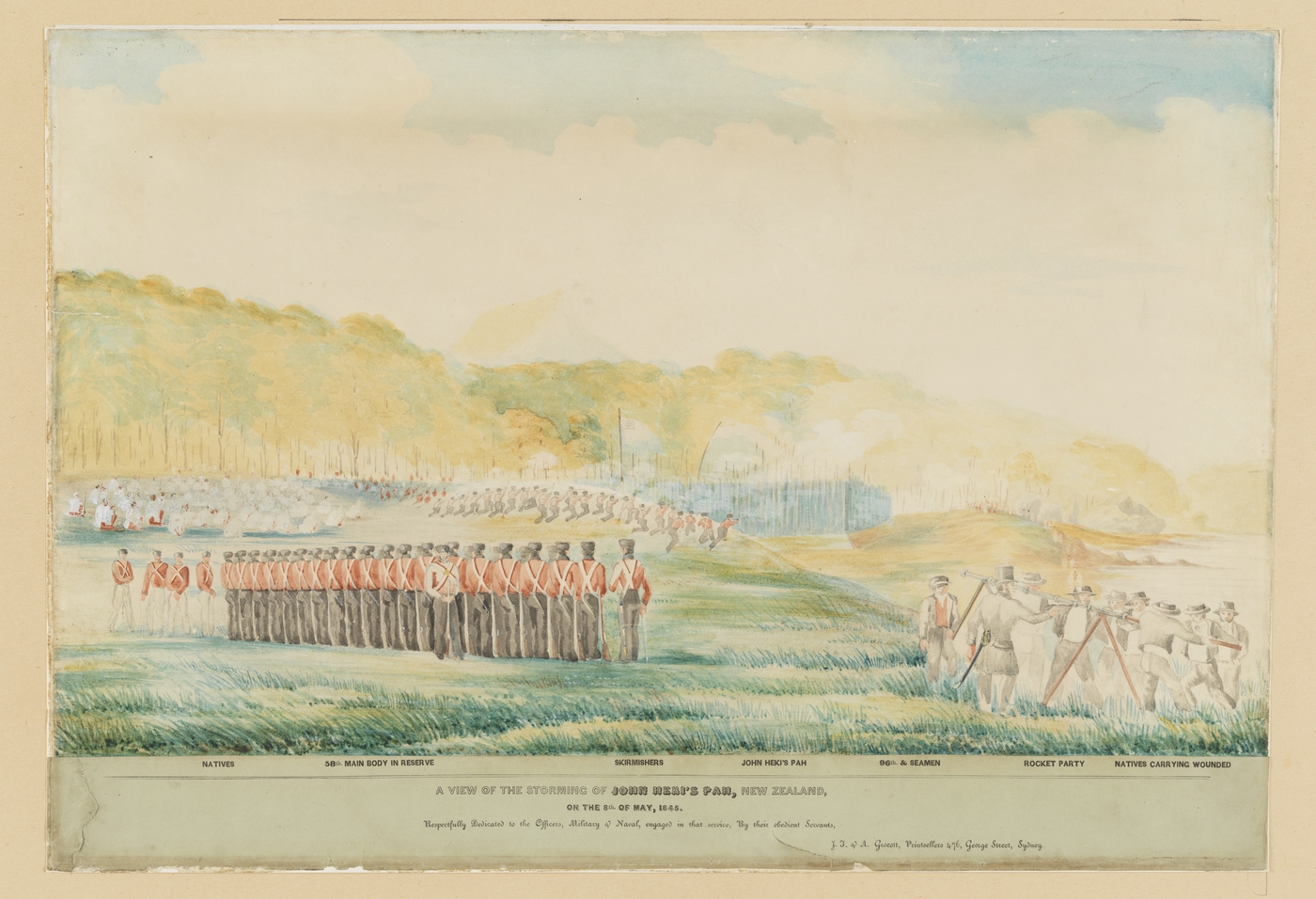
Storming of Hone Heke’s pā, New Zealand, on 8 May 1845

On 8 May 1845 Heke's Pā at Puketutu (Te Mawhe) was attacked by troops from the 58th, 96th and 99th Regiments with marines and a Congreve rocket unit, under the command of Lt Col William Hulme.

The British troops had no heavy guns but they had brought with them a dozen Congreve rockets. The Māori had never seen rockets used and were anticipating a formidable display. The first two missed their target completely; the third hit the palisade, duly exploded and was seen to have done no damage. This display gave considerable encouragement to the Māori. Soon all the rockets had been expended leaving the palisade intact.

The storming parties began to advance, first crossing a narrow gulley between the lake and the pā. Kawiti and his warriors arrived at the battle and engaged with the Colonial forces in the scrub and gullies around the pā. There followed a savage and confused battle. Eventually the discipline and cohesiveness of the British troops began to prevail and the Māori were driven back inside the pā. But they were by no means beaten, far from it, as without artillery the British had no way to overcome the defences of the pā. Hulme decided to disengage and retreat back to the Bay of Islands.

In the battle, the British suffered 14 killed and 38 wounded. The Māori losses were 47 killed and about 80 wounded.

== Battle of Te Ahuahu ==
After the successful defence of Puketutu (Te Mawhe) Pā on the shores of Lake Omapere, the pā was abandoned, in accordance with Māori custom, as blood had been spilt there, so that the place became tapu. Hōne Heke returned to the pā he had built at Te Ahuahu. Tāmati Wāka Nene built a pā at Okaihau in the days that followed that battle at Puketutu (Te Mawhe) Pā. The warriors of Heke Tāmati Wāka Nene fought several minor skirmishes with the warriors of Heke and Kawiti.

The hostilities disrupted the food production and in order to obtain provisions for his warriors, in early June 1845 Heke went to Kaikohe and on to Pakaraka to gather food supplies. (Note: Letter of Archdeacon Henry Williams to the Reverend E. G. Marsh. 18 April 1845 (p 115); Letter Mrs. Williams to Mrs. Heathcote, 5 & 8 July 1845 (p. 116) describe Heke's warriors eating the potatoes and other stores at the farm at Pakaraka.) During his absence one of Tāmati Wāka Nene's allies, the Hokianga chief, Makoare Te Taonui, attacked and captured Te Ahuahu. This was a tremendous blow to Heke's mana or prestige, obviously it had to be recaptured as soon as possible.

Until the 1980s, histories of the Northern War tend to ignore the poorly documented Battle of Te Ahuahu yet it was the most significant fight of the entire war as it is the only engagement that can be described as a clear victory – not for the British forces – but for Tāmati Wāka Nene and his warriors. However, there are no detailed accounts of the action. It was fought entirely between the Māori warriors on 12 June 1845 near by Te Ahuahu at Pukenui – Hōne Heke and his warriors against Tāmati Wāka Nene and his warriors. As there was no official British involvement in the action there is little mention of the event in contemporary British accounts. Hugh Carleton (1874) mentions

Heke committed the error (against the advice of Pene Taui) of attacking Walker [Tāmati Wāka Nene], who had advanced to Pukenui. With four hundred men, he attacked about one hundred and fifty of Walker's party, taking them also by surprise; but was beaten back with loss. Kahakaha was killed, Haratua was shot through the lungs. (Note: Thomas Walker was a name adopted by Tāmati Wāka Nene.)

Richard Davis also recorded that

a sharp battle was fought on the 12th inst. between the loyal and disaffected natives. The disaffected, although consisting of 500 men, were kept at bay all day, and ultimately driven off the field by the loyalists, although their force did not exceed 100. Three of our people fell, two on the side of the disaffected, and one on the side of the loyalists. When the bodies were brought home, as one of them was a principal chief of great note and bravery, he was laid in state, about a hundred yards from our fence, before he was buried. The troops were in the Bay at the time, and were sent for by Walker, the conquering chief; but they were so tardy in their movements that they did not arrive at the seat of war to commence operations until the 24th inst.! (Note: The comment by the Revd. Richard Davis that ‘Three of our people fell’ can be assumed to be a reference to Ngāpuhi that had been baptised as Christians by the CMS mission.)

At the Battle of Te Ahuahu on 12 June 1845 Nene's warriors carried the day. Heke lost at least 30 warriors and was driven from Te Ahuahu leaving Tāmati Wāka Nene in control of Heke's pā. Haratua recovered from his wound. Heke was severely wounded and did not rejoin the conflict until some months later, at the closing phase of the Battle of Ruapekapeka. After the battle of Te Ahuahu Heke went to Kaikohe to recover from his wounds. He was visited by Henry Williams and Robert Burrows, who hoped to persuade Heke to end the fighting. In a letter to Lieutenant Colonel Despard the battle was described by Tāmati Wāka Nene as a "most complete victory over Heke".

== Battle of Ruapekapeka Pā ==
The siege of Ruapekapeka began on 27 December 1845 and continued until 11 January 1846. This pā had been constructed by Te Ruki Kawiti to apply, and improve on, the defensive design used at Ohaeawai Pā; the external palisades at Ruapekapeka Pā provided a defence against cannon and musket fire and a barrier to attempted assaults on the pā.

Over two weeks, the British bombarded the pā with cannon fire until the external palisades were breached on 10 January 1846. On Sunday, 11 January William Walker Turau, the brother of Eruera Maihi Patuone, discovered that the pā appeared to have been abandoned; although Te Ruki Kawiti and a few of his followers remained behind, and appeared to have been caught unaware by the British assault. An assaulting force drove Kawiti and his warriors out of the pā. Fighting took place behind the pā and most casualties occurred in this phase of the battle.

It was later suggested that most of the Māori had been at church as many of them were devout Christians. Knowing that their enemy, the British, were also Christians they had not expected an attack on a Sunday. The Revd. Richard Davis noted in his diary of 14 January 1846

Yesterday the news came that the Pa was taken on Sunday by the sailors, and that twelve Europeans were killed and thirty wounded. The native loss uncertain. It appears the natives did not expect fighting on the Sabbath, and were, the great part of them, out of the Pa, smoking and playing. It is also reported that the troops were assembling for service. The tars, having made a tolerable breach with their cannon on Saturday, took the opportunity of the careless position of the natives, and went into the Pa, but did not get possession without much hard fighting, hand to hand.

However, later commentators cast doubt as to this explanation of the events of Sunday, 11 January as fighting continued on Sunday at the Battle of Ohaeawai. Another explanation provided by later commentators is that Heke deliberately abandoned the pā to lay a trap in the surrounding bush as this would provide cover and give Heke a considerable advantage. If this is the correct explanation, then the Heke's ambush was only partially successful, as Kawiti's men, fearing their chief had fallen, returned towards the pā and the British forces engaged in battle with the Māori rebels immediately behind the pā.

In any event after four hours of battle, the Māori rebels withdrew. The British forces, left in occupation of the pā, proclaimed a victory.

== End of the Flagstaff War ==
Shortly after Ruapekapeka, Heke and Kawiti met their principal Māori opponent, the loyalist chief, Tāmati Wāka Nene, and agreed upon peace. Nene went to Auckland to tell the governor that peace had been won; with Nene insisting that the British accept the terms of Kawiti and Heke that they were to be unconditionally pardoned for their rebellion.

The governor, George Grey presented the end of the rebellion as a British victory. Grey had no respect for the political stance that Heke assumed, saying "I cannot discover that the rebels have a single grievance to complain of which would in any degree extenuate their present conduct and. . . I believe that it arises from an irrational contempt of the powers of Great Britain." Not withstanding this opinion, Heke and George Grey were reconciled at a meeting in May 1848 at Te Waimate mission.

== Legacy of Hōne Heke ==
The ingenious design of the Ohaeawai Pā and the Ruapekapeka Pā became known to other Māori tribes. These designs were the basis of what is now called the gunfighter pā that were built during the later New Zealand Wars. The capture of Ruapekapeka Pā can be considered a British tactical victory, but it was purpose-built as a target for the British, and its loss was not damaging; Heke and Kawiti managed to escape with their forces intact.

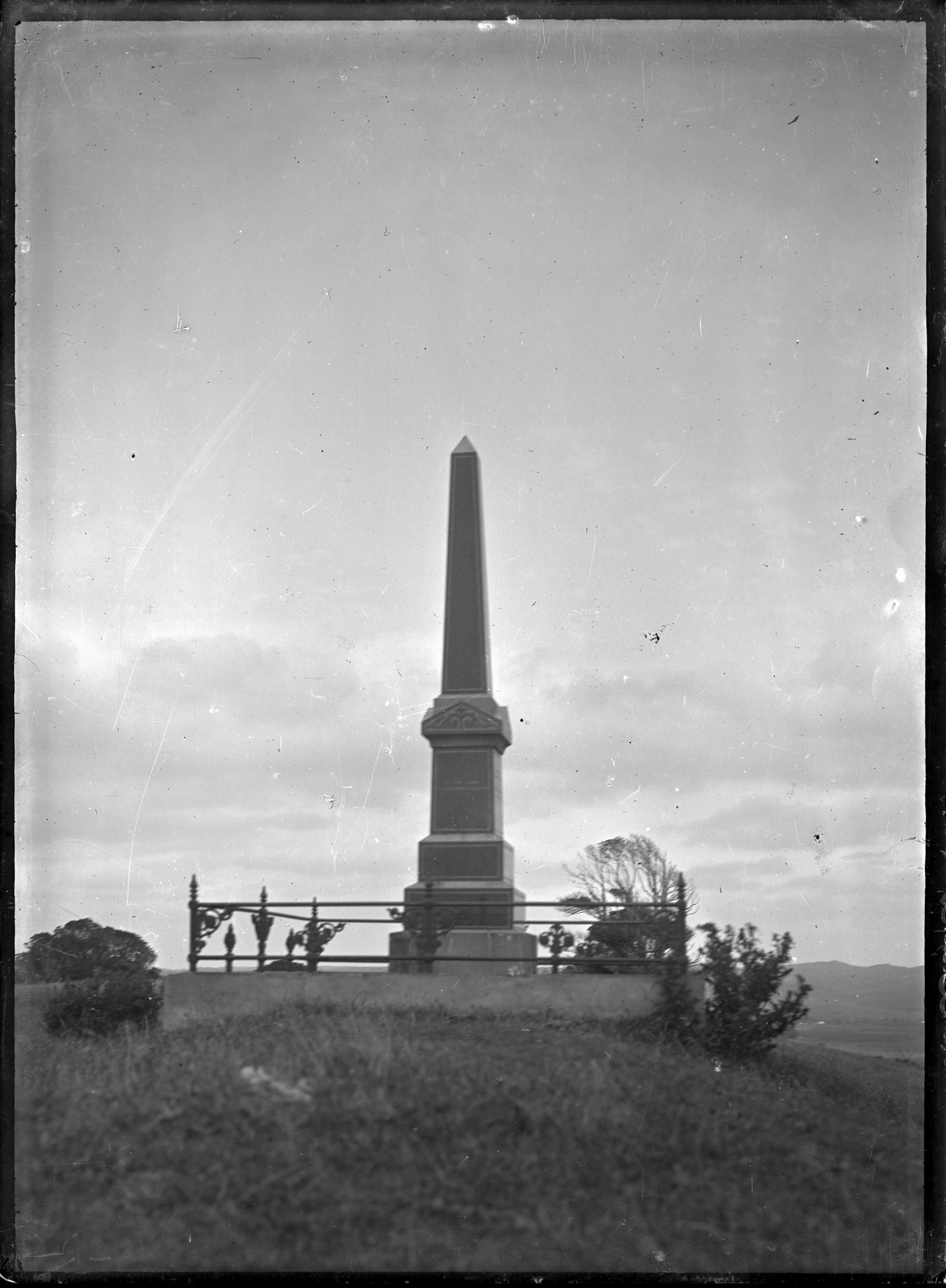
Monument to Hōne Heke at Kaikohe

It is clear that Kawiti and Heke made considerable gains from the war, despite the British victory at Ruapekapeka. After the war's conclusion, Heke enjoyed a considerable surge in prestige and authority. The missionary Richard Davis, writing on 28 August 1846, stated that "amongst his countrymen, as a patriot, he has raised himself to the very pinnacle of honour, and is much respected wherever he goes".

Following the conflict Hōne Heke retired to Kaikohe. There, two years later, he died of tuberculosis on 7 August 1850. The Revd. Richard Davis performed a Christian ceremony and then his second wife Hariata Rongo (a daughter of Hongi Hika) and other followers who had been his bodyguards for many years, took his body to a cave near Pakaraka, called Umakitera. In April 2011 it was announced by David Rankin, (of Te Matarahurahu hapū (subtribe) of the Ngāpuhi and the Hōne Heke Foundation), that the bones of Hōne Heke would be moved and buried at a public cemetery, as the land near the cave was being developed, and in May 2011 he supervised the move; although some Ngāpuhi questioned his right to do so.

A relief sculpture of Heke can be found on the Auckland High Court building walls, and which was sculpted by Anton Teutenberg and unveiled in 1866.

== Sources ==
- Carleton, Hugh (1874). "Vol. II". The Life of Henry Williams. Early New Zealand Books (ENZB), University of Auckland Library.
- Coleman, John Noble (1865). "IX". Memoir of the Rev. Richard Davis. Early New Zealand Books (ENZB), University of Auckland Library. pp. 279–363.
- Cowan, James (1922). "Volume I: 1845–1864". The New Zealand Wars: a history of the Maori campaigns and the pioneering period. Wellington: R.E. Owen. pp. 73–144.
- Moon, Paul (2001). Hone Heke: Nga Puhi Warrior. Auckland: David Ling Publishing. ISBN 978-0-908990-76-4.
- Kawiti, Tawai (October 1956). "Heke's War in the North". Te Ao Hou / The New World (16): 38–46.
