= Nōpera Panakareao =

New Zealand tribal leader, evangelist and assessor

Nōpera Panakareao (? – 13 April 1856) was a New Zealand tribal leader, evangelist and assessor. Of Māori descent, he identified with the Te Rarawa iwi.

Nōpera lived at Kaitaia. He became a friend of William Gilbert Puckey, the son of William Puckey, who worked with Joseph Matthews to establish the Church Missionary Society mission station at Kaitaia in 1833. He was called Noble Pana-kareao by the missionaries, who held him in high regard.

Nōpera signed the Treaty of Waitangi. He stated his understanding of the Treaty as, "Ko te atarau o te whenua i riro i a te kuini, ko te tinana o te whenua i waiho ki ngā Māori", meaning; "The shadow of the land will go to the Queen [of the United Kingdom], but the substance of the land will remain with us". Nōpera later reversed his earlier statement – feeling that the substance of the land had indeed gone to the Queen; only the shadow remained for the Māori. His wife Ereonora also signed the treaty beside his name.

In 1842, a dispute arose over land at Oruru and Manganui, belonging to Panakareao by hereditary right from Poroa. Some of his distant relatives – the father of Pororua, and others – having no land on which to live, were permitted by Poroa to live at Oruru. Panakareao wished to expel those people when Pororua's relatives took the liberty of selling large portions at Oruru and Manganui to Europeans. Governor William Hobson and the Land Commissioner visited Kaitaia to conciliate a settlement between the disputants.

During the Flagstaff War (1845–46), Panakareao supported Tamati Waka Nene and his brother Eruera Maihi Patuone in opposing Hōne Heke and Te Ruki Kawiti.

Nopera Panakareao participated in the Battle of Ruapekapeka together with Tāmati Wāka Nene, Eruera Maihi Patuone, Tawhai, Repa and about 450 warriors.

His wife Ereonora died in March 1848, and was buried on 22 March, with William Puckey reading the lesson, and Joseph Matthews delivering the prayer.
