= Eruera Maihi Patuone =

Māori chief and leader

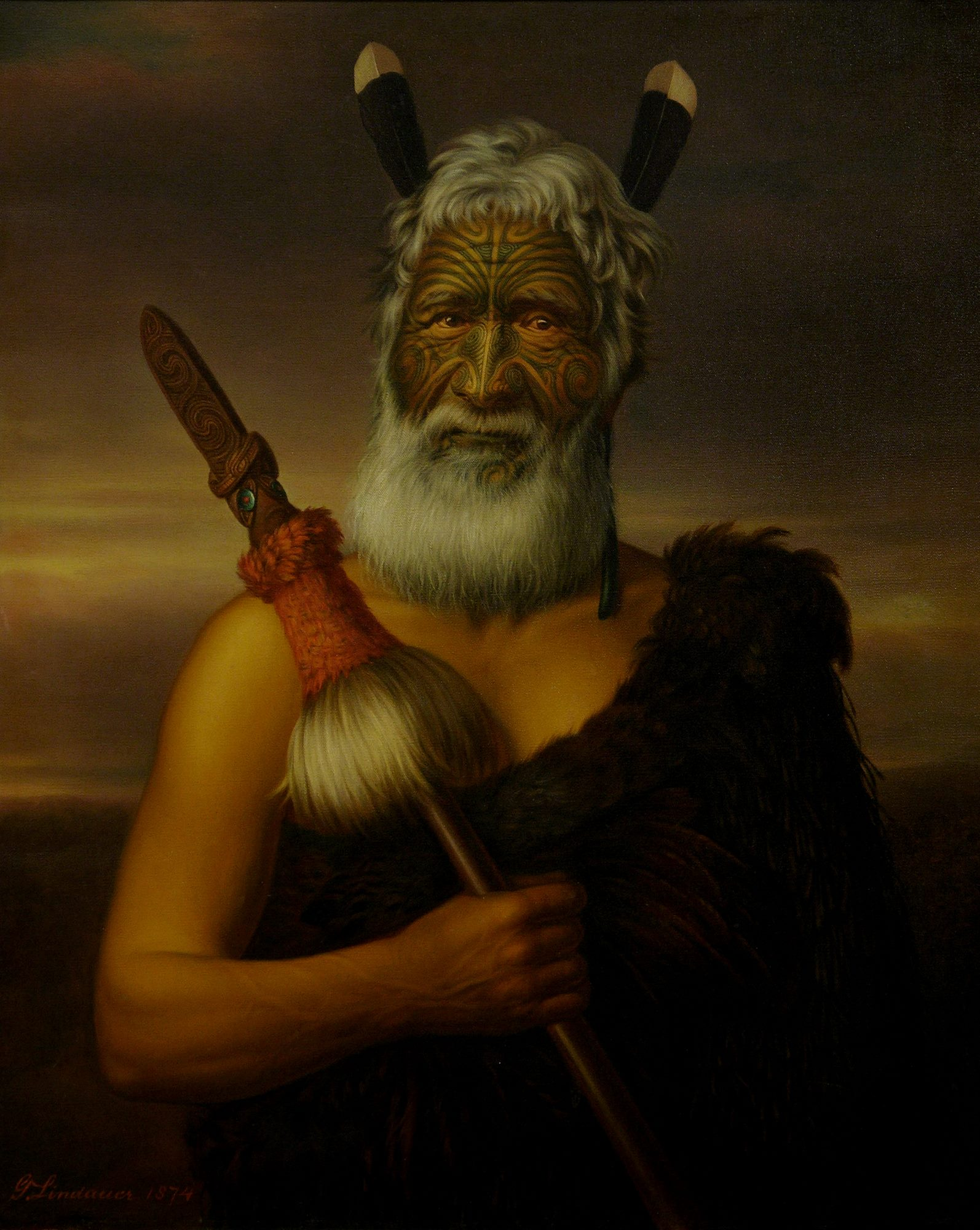
- Portrait of Eruera Maihi Patuone by Gottfried Lindauer
- Born: c. 1764
- Died: 19 September 1872

Eruera Maihi Patuone (c. 1764 – 19 September 1872) was a Māori rangatira (chief), the son of the Ngāti Hao chief Tapua and his wife Te Kawehau. His exact birth year is not known, but it is estimated that he was at least 108 years old when he died.

His younger brother was Tāmati Wāka Nene. With his father and brother, he was one of the first Māori people to have contact with Europeans when James Cook's ship visited in 1769.

== Name ==
He was named Patuone at birth and acquired his longer name when he was baptised by Archdeacon Henry Williams at Paihia on Sunday, 26 January 1840, a few days prior to the initial signing of the Treaty of Waitangi on 6 February. Eruera Maihi (Edward Marsh) was the name of Williams' spiritual mentor in England, and this name was also given to Williams' oldest son. Patuone's third wife was Takarangi, sister of Te Kupenga, a chief of Ngāti Paoa. Takarangi was baptised at the same time, adopting the name Riria (Lydia). Prior to this, in the Māori fashion, the name was simply Patuone, commemorating the deaths of two older brothers, Te Anga and Te Ruanui, killed fighting alongside their father Tapua during wars against the Whangaroa tribe Ngāti Pou, who had earlier been forced out of the Hokianga area by expanding hapu (sub-tribal) groupings of what later came to be called Ngāpuhi.

== Family ==
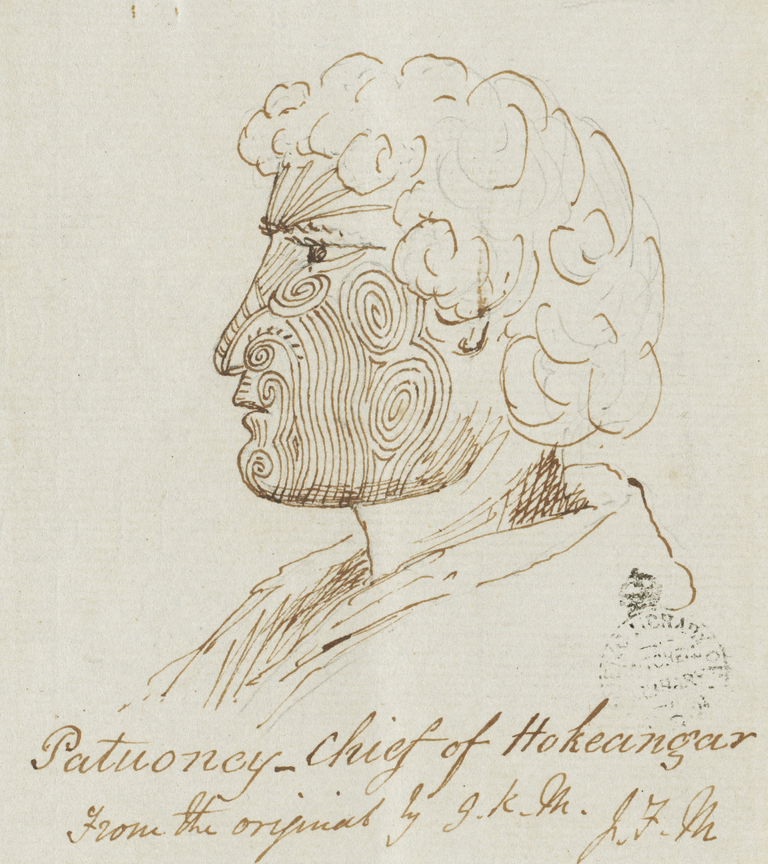
Portrait of Eruera Maihi Patuone, c. 1837, by GK Mann

Both of Patuone's older brothers Te Anga and Te Ruanui had been killed in fighting on a beach (one), suffering blows from clubs (patu) in fierce hand-to-hand fighting. Thus Patuone's name commemorates an important family event, this being a typical Māori naming convention.

Patuone was born the third son and fourth child, there being, in addition to Te Anga and Te Ruanui, an older sister Tari, later to marry the Bay of Islands chief Te Wharerahi, older brother of Rewa and Moka 'Kainga-mataa' and their sister Te Karehu. Patuone's younger brother Nene (later to be Tāmati Wāka (Thomas Walker) Nene after his baptism which took place prior to Patuone's) was also a highly distinguished chief and collaborated with his tuakana (older brother) on many military and commercial campaigns. Both were fierce promoters of European ways. In their eyes, once Māori had begun to accept European goods in trade and adopt European ways as land sales took place, there was no turning back. Pākehā (Europeans) were there to stay.

The Tapua/Te Kawehau family was directly descended through multiple senior chiefly lines from the eponymous ancestor of Ngāpuhi, Rahiri, and his first-born son Uenuku (whose mother was Ahuaiti) and second-born son, Kaharau (whose mother was Whakaruru). In addition to being the ariki of Ngāti Hao, Tapua was also the tohunga (high priest). These were the roles and status (mana) Patuone was to inherit from Tapua. Patuone's grandmother Ripia was also a tohunga in her own right. Patuone was to invoke her name in a famous pepeha (retort) to his kinsman Hōne Heke at Ōhaeawai: "Ko te whaiti a Ripia!" ("We are the small band of Ripia!") meaning that we are small in number but valiant in battle. This was in response to Heke's observation that Patuone and Nene, having arrived as a taua to confront their kin who had taken an anti-British stand, with a force of some one hundred, would do better to return home, whereas the forces Heke and Kawiti numbered some eight hundred. Thus Patuone was both inheritor of famous warrior blood and of priestly authority, two attributes which explain in part his capacities and longevity through endless tribal wars and changes such as the arrival of the Pākehā.

As one of the senior chiefs of the Ngāpuhi confederation, Patuone was involved, together with his younger brother Nene, in many military campaigns throughout the North Island. Through descent from Rahiri also, Patuone was closely related to all the major chiefs of Ngāpuhi, including Hongi Hika, Moetara, Hōne Heke, Te Ruki Kawiti, Waikato, Pōmare, Tītore, Muriwai, Pangari, Taonui, Te Whareumu and Taiwhanga.

Patuone was thus born into the fighting aristocracy of the Ngāpuhi and from an early age was trained in both the arts of war and in the priesthood. He was famed for his skills and knowledge in both areas, becoming a trusted confidant of many in both the Māori and Pākehā worlds. In fulfilment of the predictions of seers who foretold the coming of the Pākehā, Patuone witnessed their arrival. His father Tapua was received on board the Endeavour by Captain James Cook on his visit to the Bay of Islands in 1770. Potential enemies knew of the warrior reputation of the Tapua family.

== Pākehā relationships ==
Both Patuone and Nene were highly influential in affairs of the developing nation of New Zealand and Patuone in particular, despite his military prowess, together with his brother-in-law Te Wharerahi, became known as Peacemaker. Pākehā also referred to him as the Father of the Pakeha since his protection afforded them the capacity to establish a foothold in what was a wild and challenging land, full of dangers to person and property.

At the negotiations at Waitangi on 5 February 1840, Ngāpuhi chief Te Wharerahi spoke for peace and the acceptance of the European, and was duly supported by Patuone and his brother Nene. Patuone's influence was particularly strong at this gathering of northern chiefs for the signing of the Treaty of Waitangi; persuading a number of chiefs to sign this document on 6 February 1840. Thus, while Patuone would never shy from battle as a last resort, his efforts to avoid conflicts and to settle disputes through negotiation would always precede military conflicts.

During the Flagstaff War (1845–46) he supported his brother Tāmati Wāka Nene in opposing Hōne Heke and Te Ruki Kawiti. Patuone participated in the Battle of Ruapekapeka together with Tāmati Wāka Nene, Nopera Pana-kareao, Eruera Maihi Tawhai, Repa and about 450 warriors.

=== Commercial interests ===
On the commercial front, Patuone, as a major chief of the Hokianga, controlled many resources, including extensive kauri (Agathis australis) forests. As well as being prized by the Royal Navy for spars, kauri became a valuable export to New South Wales. Patuone was instrumental in encouraging merchants in Sydney to establish a timber mill and shipbuilding yard at Horeke in about 1826.

=== Governors ===
Patuone knew all of the governors of New Zealand up to his death and was consulted by them. He developed a particular friendship with Sir George Grey who was to serve two terms as governor. While Grey's judgment and increasing eccentricity created many problems and Māori became increasingly disaffected and alienated in the face of Pakeha law, the friendship remained. Patuone was also an important informant for Grey on the many works he produced on things Māori. Friendship also survived Grey's decision to invade the Waikato, totally against the advice of both Patuone and Tauwhitu, another influential chief whose base was the Matakana, near Kawau Island where Grey maintained a residence, Mansion House, having set the island up as a botanic and animal showcase.

== Tribal wars ==
Famously, in hand-to-hand combat in 1806 at the battle of Waituna, Patuone killed the Te Roroa/Ngati Whatua chief Tatakahuanui.

Thereafter, in no small way, both Patuone and Nene were to contribute to the fame of Ngāpuhi as a fighting force, even in the face of major defeats such as the battle of Moremonui in 1807 where the Ngāpuhi taua (war party) were surprised at breakfast by a combined Ngāti Whatua/Te Roroa force. While Patuone and Nene were not present at this fight, it was a major rout and many of the major chiefs of Ngāpuhi present were killed, including Heke's uncle Pokaia and Te Houawe, older brother of Hongi Hika. Hongi's sister Waitapu was also killed and her body desecrated, all it is said as part of helping Hongi to escape to carry on in name and deed the family honour now handed to him with the death of his tuakana. Hongi named one of his muskets Te Teke Tanumia to commemorate his sister's terrible death: she was slit open from the genital region and filled with sand.

Given the close kinship connections between Ngāpuhi, Ngāti Whatua and Te Roroa, this battle was typically a product of many take (issues) overtaking kinship linkages. It was also an endemic feature of groupings in the north: war was not confined to those who were not related. Such was the slaughter of Ngāpuhi at Moremonui that the event became known as Te-Kai-a-Te-Karoro (The Seagull's Feast). It was, however, the kinship links which led to a line being drawn in the sand by Te Teke under instructions from the chief Taoho, beyond which no further killing was to take place. Thus, some key Ngāpuhi made their escape as a result of kinship and through an act of chivalry so typically Māori. It would not be until 1825 and the battle of Te-Ika-a-Ranganui near Kaiwaka, that Ngāpuhi extracted a terrible utu (reprisal; payback) for their military disaster at Moremonui. Part of the Ngāpuhi problem was their confidence in that they possessed more muskets but also an unfortunate choice of encampment, vulnerable to surprise attack from concealed positions.

The period from 1815 to 1840 saw many wars involving Ngāpuhi with southern tribal groupings, especially Ngāti Whatua, Ngāti Paoa, Ngāti Maru and Waikato generally. Following a particularly acrimonious period of major battles with Ngāti Paoa in particular, as part of a peace deal between Ngāpuhi and Ngāti Paoa, Patuone married Takarangi, sister of the Ngāti Paoa chief Te Kupenga. This was about 1828. Thereafter, Patuone moved his base to the Hauraki area of South Auckland, maintaining pā (defensive, fortified villages) at Whakatiwai on the Hauraki Gulf south of present-day Auckland and at Putiki on Waiheke Island. Later, following the gift of 115 acres (0.47 km^{2}) at Takapuna, Patuone set up his estate there. Nene was left to supervise and safeguard interests in the Hokianga.

== Later years ==
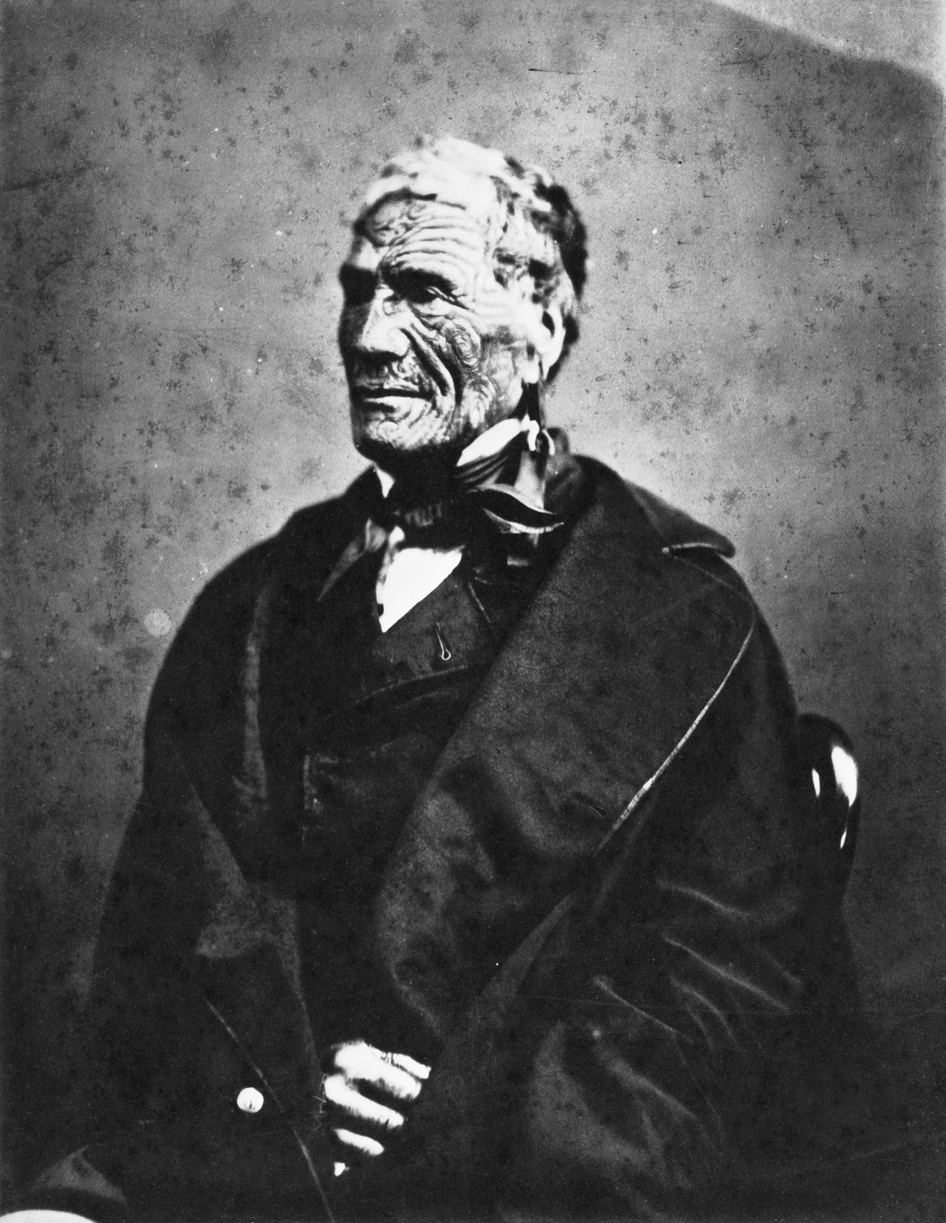
Portrait of Eruera Maihi Patuone

Patuone's later years in Auckland did not preclude his being called upon to perform specific duties including being part of the welcome to the Prince and Princess of Wales. As well as continuing business in timber, potatoes and flax (Phormium tenax). Patuone also bred horses. Grey had given him a horse called New Zealander which enjoyed some success at the Auckland races. Patuone was also the source of the first horse ever owned by Te Arawa, a piebald horse called Taika. In the Māori value system, horses carried great value, being regarded as superior property.

Patuone and Nene were both to outlive all the old chiefs of Ngāpuhi, the deaths of whom began in 1828 with Hongi, Te Whareumu and Muriwai. Patuone directed the rituals leading up to and following the death of Hongi, his relative and fellow warrior. It was a time of great upheaval and Hongi's death, some two years after sustaining a bullet wound in battle with Ngāti Pou, led to great fears about revenge attacks from the south. Through Hongi, much suffering had been visited upon the southern tribes. But, New Zealand was developing into a new nation, forged as were many in conflict and difference. 1828 was also a year of family deaths for Patuone: his first wife, Te Wheke, his first-born son Toa, another son Mata and a daughter. Most likely, these deaths were due to some introduced infectious agent such as Tuberculosis. Like many indigenous peoples, Māori had no resistance to introduced diseases and suffered greatly as a result of these. Even things like influenza proved deadly, quite apart from more serious infectious agents and venereal diseases brought in by sailors and settlers.

Having outlived all their fellow chiefs, both Patuone and Nene were subjected to considerable resentment from Kawiti's son, Maihi Paraone Kawiti who had personal pretensions and supporters seeking to have him made arikinui or paramount chief of Ngāpuhi. Aside from issues of lineage, descent, seniority and mana, this plan foundered. Ngāpuhi was always a coalition of closely related chiefs, all of whom had "standing" in their own right and therefore any notion of a paramount chief was fraught with challenges. It was certainly not a debate into which Patuone and Nene entered: they had no reason to do so as their senior status and great personal mana was clear to all. Nene certainly offered to build a flour mill at his own expense for Kawiti and Heke's people as part of a peace offering but equally, sought the re-erection of the flagstaff at Maiki Hill, an undertaking given by the senior Kawiti prior to his death. Maihi P. Kawiti's petulance was thus many-layered and complex.

Patuone was also given a suit of armour by King William IV of Great Britain and a range of other clothing. The official record indicates that the gift was released from the Tower of London on 16 July 1836 and was finally delivered to and signed for by Patuone on 4 November 1837 by the Royal Navy ship HMS Buffalo. The delivery directly to Patuone at his Pā at Whakatiwai on the Hauraki Gulf, where he was living at the time indicates considerable efficiency on the part of the Royal Navy. HMS Buffalo had also brought Governor Hindmarsh to South Australia and remained there while a suitable house was built for the Governor in order that the Governor could live on board in comfort in the interim.

The precise reasons for the gift are unclear but may be related either to Patuone's provision of kauri spars to the Royal Navy or be a gift as part of consolidation of a commercial relationship. The fate of the suit of armour (which was from the time of King Charles II) is unknown, however, the damp New Zealand climate and likely storage in less than ideal conditions, may well have affected it. Further, since it would have been regarded as a significant taonga (treasure), it is unlikely that it would have been broken up and forged into weapons. No detail is recorded in family archives.

On 26 February 1840 the Rev. Henry Williams baptised Patuone, and also, Patuone's wife, by the name of Lydia. Patuone's four wives (Te Wheke, Te Hoia, Takarangi and Rutu) bore a total of twelve children. Hohaia (c.1825-1901), outlived Patuone the longest. Hori Hare Patuone (c.1835-1878) also outlived Patuone and another unnamed Patuone child died in 1886. Patuone's whāngai (adopted) son Timoti (son of a relative, Matetakahia, killed in unfortunate circumstances by Nene), died in 1896. Nene was frequently too hasty in meting out 'justice' and his killing of Matetakahia, whom he thought guilty of the killing of an English trader named Wharangi, was but one example of this haste. The person responsible for the killing of Wharangi was Te Ngarara, who was in turn shot dead as utu (retribution) for the wrongful death of Matetakahia at the hands of Nene. Nene's high status prevented direct utu against him.

By the 1840s he had settled at Barrys Point. By 1853 Ngāti Pāoa arrived and had settled the area, at this point in time a settlement known as Waiwharariki—located in Takapuna—had been established by Patuone, on land gifted to him by George Grey. In 1851, when Ngāti Pāoa had threatened to attack Auckland, Patuone sided with the British was viewed positively by colonial authorities.

While some have questioned Patuone's birth details and recollections about Captain Cook's visit to the Bay of Islands in 1770, it is important to recognise the supreme intellectual capacities of great rangatira like Patuone who were trained within the whare wananga over many years to learn and retain copious details across a wide range of everyday and esoteric/priestly knowledge. Tohunga were really the means by which critical knowledge was preserved and handed on; they were the encyclopaedia for Māori. Error was not permitted and would have resulted in instant expulsion from the whare wananga. The mental capacities of senior chiefs and tohunga like Patuone would astound early Pākehā explorers and lead to much comment. Therefore, errors in facts and information were highly unlikely, especially from authoritative sources such as Patuone.

== Patuone's legacy and important political issues ==
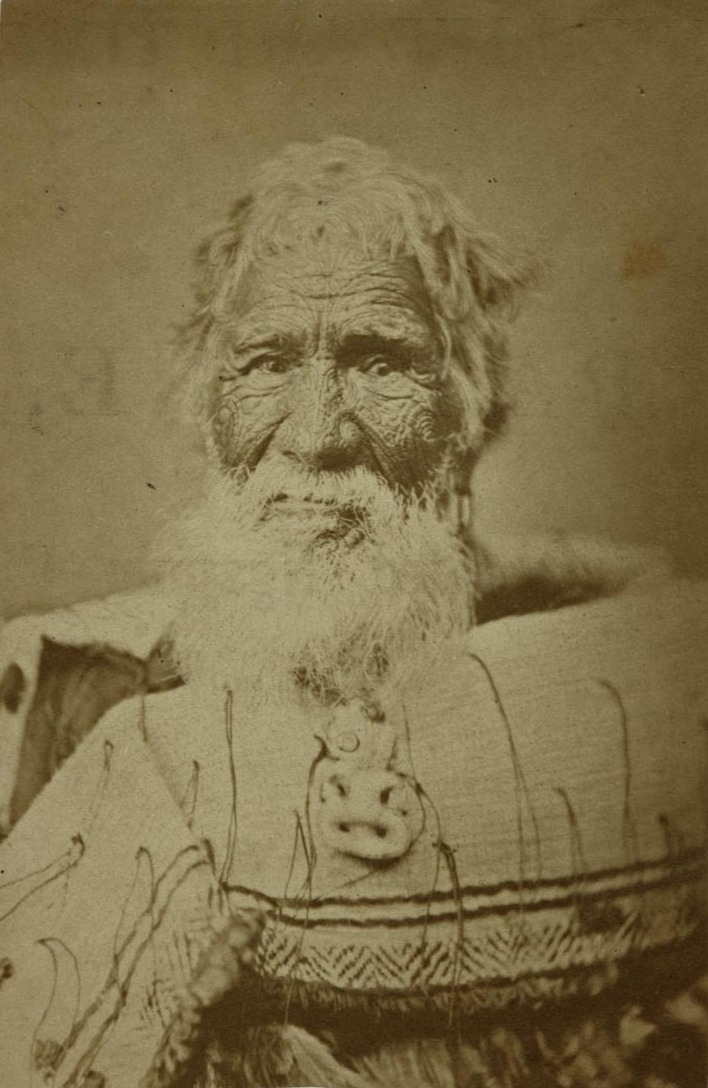
Patuone in his later years

The life of Patuone spanned the earliest years of Pākehā settlement of Aotearoa/New Zealand. Patuone like other chiefly tohunga knew of the old prophecies of Te Maoi and others which foretold the arrival of Pākehā. They knew also that their future would be very different from all they had known prior. One reason why Patuone, Nene and others supported the British cause was that they knew there could be no turning back. Pākehā could not be sent home as a failed experiment and in the meantime, they had brought goods, animals, crops and technology which would greatly benefit Māori. The negative aspects of settlement (especially new diseases, new weapons, unhealthy lifestyle changes, tobacco, alcohol) certainly alarmed many Māori leaders, including Patuone, however, he felt that the good came with the bad as a package.

While the Māori population outnumbered that of settlers and transients, the missionaries of various Christian persuasions had to invest considerable efforts into the processes of "civilising", converting and persuading Māori to turn away from practices which were seen as evil, especially things like cannibalism, polygamy and war. Māori remained, however, "in control".

== Patuone in literature ==
Patuone is mentioned in a large number of publications and manuscripts but not always accurately and with any authority. The most comprehensive work dedicated to him is the C.O.Davis book, "The Life and Times of Patuone, the Celebrated Ngapuhi Chief" (1876). Davis was a close friend of Patuone in his later years and was therefore in a position to clarify much about Patuone's life to the extent that Patuone was himself prepared to allow. As a famed chief of the 'old school', imbued with great mana Patuone had nothing to prove and was not interested in any adulation. He allowed his exploits to speak for themselves in the way of the great chiefs of old.

== Bibliography ==
- Ballara, A. (2003). Taua. Auckland: Penguin Books.
- Belich, J. (1986). The New Zealand wars. Auckland: Penguin Books.
- Belich, J. (1996). Making peoples: a history of the New Zealanders. Auckland: Penguin Books.
- Binney, J. (2005). The legacy of guilt: a life of Thomas Kendall. Wellington: Bridget Williams Books.
- Cowan, James (1922). "Volume I: 1845–1864". The New Zealand Wars: a history of the Maori campaigns and the pioneering period. Wellington: R.E. Owen. pp. 73–144.
- Davis, C. O. (1876). "III". The Life and Times of Patuone, the Celebrated Ngapuhi Chief. Early New Zealand Books (NZETC). p. 8.
- Lee, J. (1987). Hokianga. Auckland: Hodder & Stoughton.
- Mein-Smith, P. (2005). A concise history of New Zealand. Cambridge: Cambridge University Press.
- Monin, P. (2001). This is my place: Hauraki contested 1769-1875. Wellington: Bridget Williams Books Limited.
- Moon, P. (2001). Hone Heke Ngāpuhi warrior. Auckland: David Ling Publishing.
- Ngata, A.T., Hurinui, P.T. (1970). Nga moteatea. Vol. III. Wellington: The Polynesian Society Inc.
- Orange, C. (2001). The Treaty of Waitangi. Wellington: Bridget Williams Books Limited.
- Orange, C. (2004). An illustrated history of the Treaty of Waitangi. Wellington: Bridget Williams Books Limited.
- Owens, J.M.R. (1974). Prophets in the wilderness. New Zealand: Auckland University Press/Oxford University Press.
- Petrie, H. (2006). Chiefs of industry. Auckland: Auckland University Press.
- Poiner-Webster, J.P. (1967). The rata tree. Self-published booklet.
- Reed, A.H. (Ed.). (1979). Māori scenes and portraits. Wellington: A.H. & A.W. Reed.
- Rusden, G.W. (1883). A history of New Zealand, Volume I. London: Chapman and Hall Limited.
- Salmond, A. (1991). Two worlds. Auckland: Viking/Penguin Books.
- Salmond, A. (2004). The trial of the cannibal dog. Auckland: Penguin Books.
- Serabian, H. (2005). Le Journal du Père Antoine Garin 1844-1846. Une édition critique présentée avec commentaire, transcription et annotations. Unpublished doctoral thesis. Christchurch: University of Canterbury.
- Smith, P.S. (1910). Māori Wars of the Nineteenth Century. Christchurch: Whitcombe and Tombs.
- Thompson, N. (2006). Heke te toa! How has Hone Heke Pokai, pictorially represented, contributed to the construction of New Zealand's national identity? Unpublished MA thesis. Christchurch: University of Canterbury.
- Urlich-Cloher, D. (2003). Hongi Hika, warrior chief. Auckland: Viking.
- Wards, I. (1968). The Shadow of the land. Wellington: A.R.Shearer, Government Printer.
