= Moka Te Kainga-mataa =

New Zealand Māori rangatira (chief)

Moka Kainga-mataa [Te Kaingamataa/Te Kaingamata/Te Kainga-mata/Te Kainga-mataa] (1790s–1860s) was a Māori rangatira (chief) of the Ngā Puhi iwi from Northland in New Zealand. He was distinguished in war and an intelligent participant in the Treaty of Waitangi process.

== Origin and mana ==
Moka Kainga-mataa was a Ngāpuhi chief of Ngai Tawake descent, who along with his brothers Te Wharerahi and Rewa, formed the Patukeha hapū in memory of their slain mother Te Auparo and sister Te Karehu. Their mother and sister had been murdered and their bodies consumed in an attack by the Ngare Raumati Iwi on Okuratope Pa, (Waimate North) in 1800.

Seven years later, in 1807, Moka's father was killed and also consumed, in the battle of Moremonui, when the Ngāpuhi went up against the Ngāti Whātua, in what is recognised as the first battle in which Māori utilised firearms.

== Musket Wars ==
Moka and his two brothers Te Wharerahi and Rewa participated in the bloody Musket Wars of the 1820s-1830s, which caused wholesale destruction across the North Island, resulting in numerous deaths, slavery, and the displacement of a large number of people. 'Moka, also known as Te Kainga-mataa, was...a distinguished chief among Hongi's (Hongi Hika) warriors...' Moka took part in numerous battles, such as Mokoia, Te Totara, Matakitaki, and Te Ika-a-ranganui (where he was shot but recovered). During one of these, Ngāpuhi war raids to the Bay of Plenty, Moka took a wife, Noho Kupenga Tipare, a Whakatohea chieftainess from Ōpōtiki (Bay of Plenty) and they had three sons and a daughter; Te Ahitapu, Rewiri Tarapata, Taawhi, and Hoki 'Peata'.

== Role and stance on New Zealand sovereignty and the Treaty of Waitangi ==
Despite being relatively overlooked by historians in relation to the Treaty process, Moka is the only Māori chief to have been involved in all three events; these being the Declaration of Independence of New Zealand, Hobson's Proclamations, and the signing of the Treaty of Waitangi.

== The United Tribes Flag/Te Hakituatahi (New Zealand's First Flag) ==
A meeting was held at Waitangi on 20 March 1834 to decide on an official trading flag for New Zealand (this was due to international trading restrictions and the subsequent seizure of a Māori ship). Approximately 25 chiefs from the Far North (including Moka, Te Wharerahi, and Rewa) as well as a number of missionaries, settlers, and commanders of visiting naval vessels were present. James Busby spoke to the chiefs and a vote was held, with the United Tribes Flag gaining 12/25 votes; as opposed to the other two designs which gained 10/25 votes and 3/25 votes, respectively. The results were recorded by one of these chiefs' sons. This flag was hoisted on the flagpole and this was accompanied by a 21-gun salute from HMS Alligator.

== Declaration of Independence/He Wakaputanga o te Rangatiratanga o Nu Tireni ==
Moka and his two brothers were original signatories to the Declaration of the Independence of New Zealand signed at Waitangi on 28 October 1835, which guaranteed the Māori chiefs their sovereignty, with this document being officially recognised by the Crown in 1836. A few years later, the Crown could see the benefits to the British Empire in gaining sovereignty over these islands and in 1839 it decided to attempt to annex New Zealand by introducing a new document that would, in effect, revoke the Declaration of Independence.

== Hobson's Proclamations ==
Captain William Hobson was sent to New Zealand with the express aim, of ensuring that this new document was formulated and agreed upon by the Māori chiefs and he arrived in the Bay of Islands aboard HMS Herald on 29 January 1840. On 30 January 1840, at the Christ Church, Kororareka, Hobson read a number of proclamations which related to the Crown's intention to extend the territories of New South Wales to include New Zealand, Hobson's own appointment as Lieutenant-Governor of New Zealand, as well as clarify guidelines in relation to land transactions (especially the issue of pre-emption). Moka was present and was the only Māori chief to sign this document Hobson's proclamation signed by inhabitants.

== Treaty of Waitangi/Tiriti o Waitangi ==
On 5 February 1840 the three brothers attended a large hui at Waitangi (400 people) where they had an opportunity to speak publicly about the agreement which became known as the Tiriti o Waitangi or Treaty of Waitangi. Rewa and Moka vigorously opposed the signing, whilst Te Wharerahi sided with the Crown. Rewa informed Hobson that they didn't need the Crown as they were their own rulers, they held sovereignty over New Zealand, and told Hobson to go back to England.

"[Moka]...was an important northern alliance leader, and he threw the weight of his mana behind his brother's opposition to the kawana and the Treaty." Moka asked Hobson a number of pertinent questions, as well as making some telling statements.

William Colenso the CMS mission printer in 1890, published his account of the signing of the Treaty of Waitangi in which some of the speeches are quoted.

Moka said "Let the Governor return to his own country: let us remain as we were. Let my lands be returned to me--all of them--those that are gone with Baker. Do not say, 'The lands will be returned to you.' Who will listen to thee, O Governor? Who will obey thee? Where is Clendon? Where is Mair? Gone to buy our lands notwithstanding the book [proclamation] of the Governor."

He had brought to public attention, the fact that a number of Europeans had been breaking the law in relation to the Proclamation signed only a week prior.

"...Moka did not express concerns that the kawana would have a greater authority than the chiefs'. Instead, his entire concern was focussed on the land question, pre-emption (the only explicit discussion of this part of the Treaty), and whether the kawana would actually have enough authority to enforce pre-emption with Europeans."

On this being interpreted to Hobson; he replied "that all lands unjustly held would be returned; and that all claims to lands, however purchased, after the date of the Proclamation would not be held to be lawful." Following Hobson's explanation, Moka also publicly challenged Charles Baker to return his land, saying "That is good, O Governor! That is straight. But stay, let me see. Yes, yes, indeed! Where is Baker? where is the fellow? Ah, there he is--there standing! Come, return to me my lands." Moka approached the raised platform on which Baker was standing and waited for an answer. This question also served as a test of Hobson's authority and power over his subjects. Baker replied quietly "E Hoki Koia?" meaning "Will it indeed return?". This did not comfort Moka, who then replied "There! Yes, that is as I said. No, no, no; all false, all false alike. The lands will not return to me."

This public statement was embarrassing for the Crown, as this did not portray the Europeans' behaviour in a positive light.

Later in the proceedings, "...Wharerahi, one of the most important and senior of the northern alliance chiefs, and older brother of Rewa and Moka...now spoke in support of it [Treaty]....He was the first chief to appeal to the idea that having the governor would assist in the creation of peace between the tribes..."

Wharerahi said: "Is it not good to be in peace? We will have this man as our Governor. What! turn him away! Say to this man of the Queen, Go back! No, no." According to Salmond (1997) '...this speech by a very powerful rangatira marked a shift in opinion at the hui.'

Hokianga chiefs Eruera Maihi Patuone and his brother Tāmati Wāka Nene joined Wharerahi and show their support toward the Crown, by arguing for them to remain in New Zealand. The following day, a number of chiefs including Te Wharerahi, decided to sign the Treaty and although Rewa held reservations, eventually he too signed. Although Moka's name appears on the Tiriti o Waitangi (in well-developed English cursive) and the claim by academics and historians that he signed this document, his "mark" is notably absent.

Māori academic Brent Kerehona (Ngāpuhi/Whakatohea/Tuhoe/Whanau-a-Apanui), claims that on close inspection, it seems as though Moka was a person of high significance. He was an original signatory to the Declaration of Independence (the same document that the Crown had aimed to revoke), was the only Māori signatory to the Proclamation and after raising specific issues, as well as questioning Hobson about pre-emption and illegal land transactions at the meeting at Waitangi, appears not to have been satisfied with the explanations provided and chose not to sign the Treaty of Waitangi.

== Primary sources ==
Declaration of Independence/He Wakaputanga o te Rangatiratanga o Nu Tireni. Dated 28 October 1835. Ref: MS-Papers-1784-277. Alexander Turnbull Library: Wellington.

Proclamation. Dated 30 January 1840. Ref: fms-Papers-227-01. Alexander Turnbull Library: Wellington.

Hobson's proclamation signed by the inhabitants. Dated 30 January 1840. Ref: IA 1, 1840/32 (micro 3626). Archives New Zealand: Wellington.

Letter of congratulation to Governor Hobson from the inhabitants of Kororareka. Dated 30 January 1840. Ref: IA 1, 1840/33. Archives New Zealand: Wellington.

Treaty of Waitangi/Tiriti O Waitangi. Dated 6 February 1840. Ref: IA 9/9. Archives New Zealand: Wellington.
