= Tāmati Wāka Nene =

Māori chief (1780s–1871)

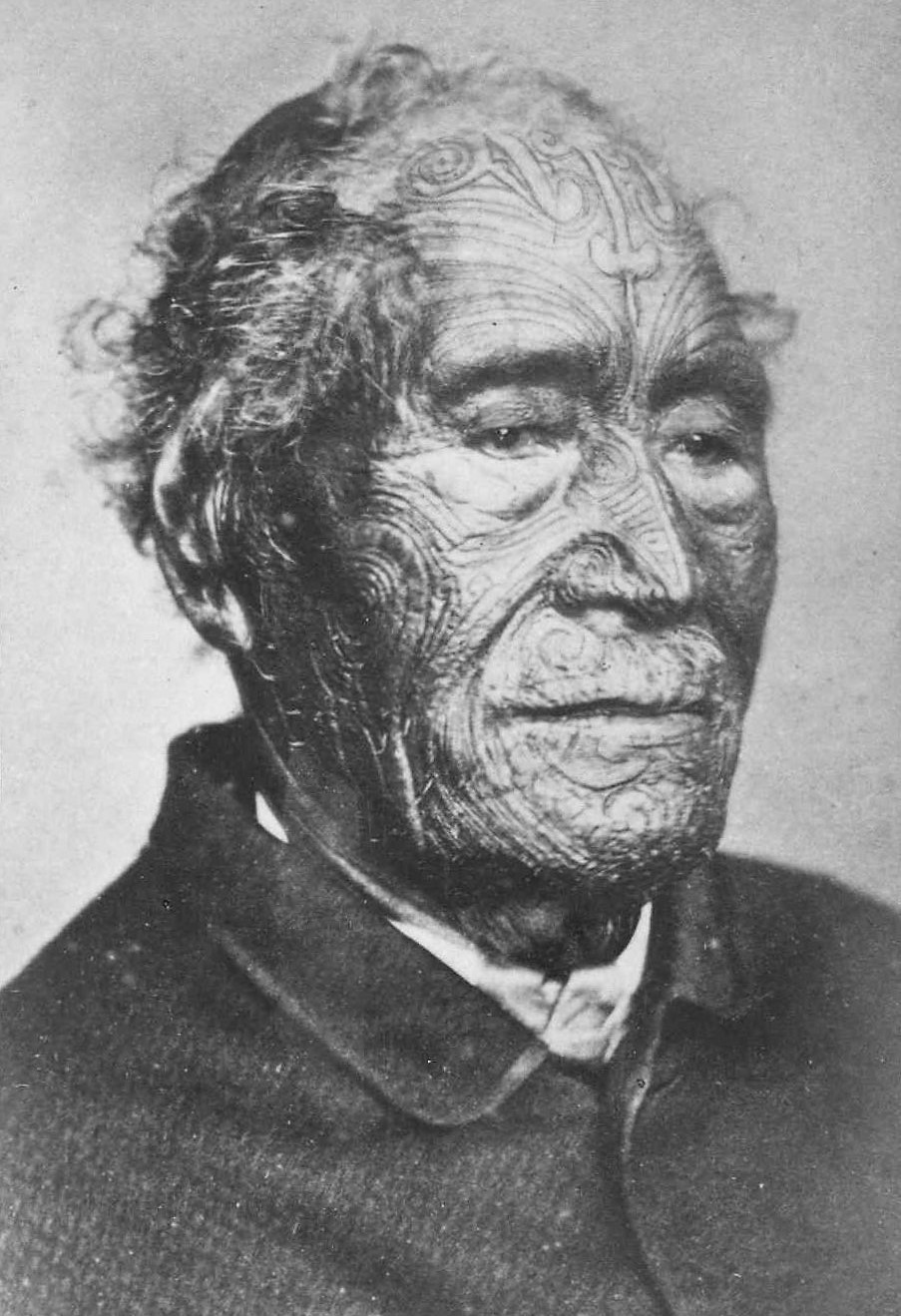
- Tāmati Wāka Nene, c. 1870
- Born: 1780s Northland Peninsula
- Died: 4 August 1871; Russell, Colony of New Zealand

Tāmati Wāka Nene (1780s – 4 August 1871) was a Māori rangatira (chief) of the Ngāpuhi iwi (tribe) who fought as an ally of the British in the Flagstaff War of 1845–1846.

== Early life ==
Tāmati Wāka Nene was born to chiefly rank in the Ngāpuhi iwi (tribe) of the Bay of Islands and Hokianga regions of the North Island of New Zealand. His father was Tapua, a rangatira (chief) of the hapu (subtribe) Ngāti Hao in the Hokianga. The date of his birth was around the 1780s and his elder brother was Eruera Maihi Patuone. He was related to the warrior Hongi Hika and could trace his ancestry back to Rāhiri, the founder of the Ngāpuhi.

Nene rose to be one of the war leaders of the Ngāpuhi. It is likely that one of his earliest battles was in about 1800, against the Ngare Raumati. Nene took an active part in the Musket Wars of 1818 to 1820, leading his warriors on a rampage the whole length of the North Island, killing and plundering as he went until he reached Cook Strait. It is said that he advised the warrior Te Rauparaha to acquire muskets to enhance his influence in the region.

In 1828 Nene successfully averted a war between the Māori of the Bay of Islands and the Hokianga. Then his older brother moved south to what is now the Auckland region, Hauraki, and soon after the paramount chief of the area died of wounds received in battle. Wāka Nene now became the highest ranking chief among his own people and one of the three primary chiefs of the area. At baptism, he added "Tāmati Wāka" (Thomas Walker) to his name.

== Support for the Treaty of Waitangi ==
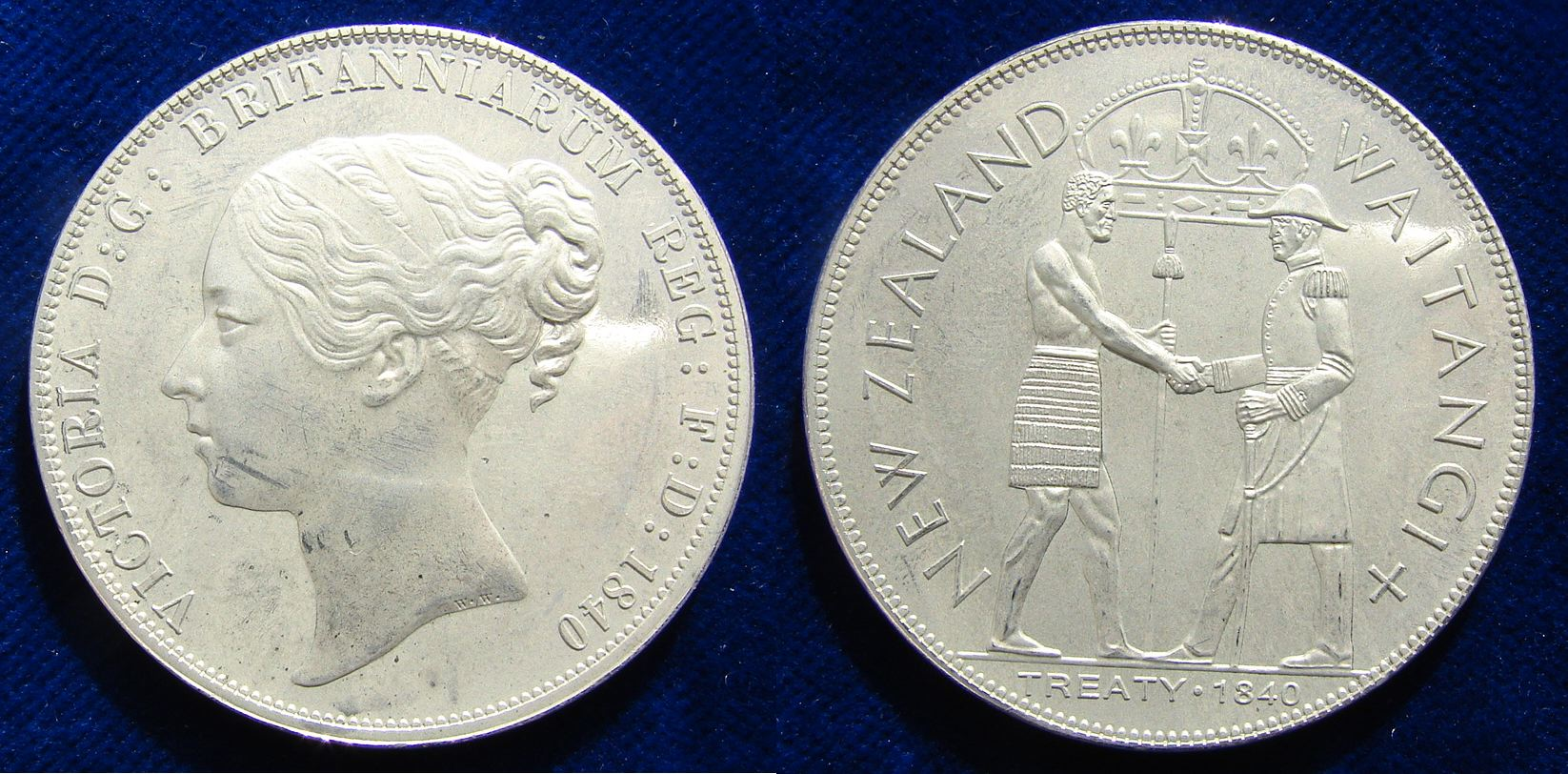
Retro Pattern Crown: Tāmati Wāka Nene shaking hands with Governor Hobson at Waitangi on 6 February 1840

Early on Nene had recognised the value of trade with Pākehā and used his position as chief to protect and encourage both the traders and the Methodist missionaries. He was baptised in 1839 taking the name Thomas Walker or Tāmati Wāka. He also worked with the British Resident, James Busby to regularise the relationships between the two races. In 1835 he signed the Declaration of the Independence of New Zealand which proclaimed the sovereignty of the United Tribes.

At the negotiations leading up to the signing of the Treaty of Waitangi Ngapuhi chief Te Wharerahi disagreed with his brothers Rewa and Moka Te Kainga-mataa and spoke for peace and the acceptance of the European, and was duly supported by Nene and Patuone. Nene's influence was significant in persuading many of the tribes to sign the Treaty.

The next few years saw a considerable loss of revenue and influence for the northern tribes. The capital of the new country was soon moved down to Auckland. Customs duties were also imposed. Then the Government began to manage the land, specifically they temporarily banned any further felling of kauri trees (Agathis australis), after an over-supply of milled kauri occurred in the Australian market.

== Commitment to Governor FitzRoy ==
On 8 July 1844 the flagstaff on Maiki Hill at the north end of Kororāreka was cut down for the first time, by the Pakaraka chief Te Haratua. Heke had set out to cut down the flagstaff but was persuaded by Archdeacon William Williams not to do so.

On 24 August 1844 Governor FitzRoy arrived in the bay from Auckland upon the frigate HMS Hazard. Governor FitzRoy summoned the Ngāpuhi chiefs to a conference at the Te Waimate mission at Waimate on 2 September and apparently defused the situation. Tāmati Wāka Nene requested the Governor to remove the troops and redress the grievances in respect of the Customs duties that were put in place in 1841, that Heke and Pōmare II viewed as damaging the maritime trade from which they benefited. Tāmati Wāka Nene and the other Ngāpuhi chiefs undertook to keep Heke in check and to protect the Europeans in Bay of Islands. Hōne Heke did not attend but sent a conciliatory letter and offered to replace the flagstaff.

On 10 January 1845 the flagstaff was cut down a second time, this time by Heke. He again cut down the flagstaff on 19 January. When Hōne Heke cut down the flag pole for the fourth time on 11 March 1845 and attacked Kororāreka, Nene was offended, feeling that his mana had been trampled on. Nene was already at war with Heke when the British troops began to arrive on the scene.

== Flagstaff War ==
After the Battle of Kororāreka, Hōne Heke and Te Ruki Kawiti and their warriors travelled inland to Lake Ōmāpere near to Kaikohe some 20 miles (32 km), or two days travel, from the Bay of Islands. Nene built a pā close to Lake Ōmāpere. Heke's pā, named Puketutu, was 2 miles (3.2 km) away, while it is sometimes named as "Te Mawhe", however the hill of that name is some distance to the north-east.

In April 1845, during the time that the colonial forces were gathering in the Bay of Islands, the warriors of Heke and Nene fought many skirmishes on the small hill named Taumata-Karamu that was between the two pās and on open country between Ōkaihau and Te Ahuahu. Heke's force numbered about three hundred men; Kawiti joined Heke towards the end of April with another hundred and fifty warriors. Opposing Heke and Kawiti were about four hundred warriors that supported Tāmati Wāka Nene, including his brother Eruera Maihi Patuone and the chiefs Makoare Te Taonui and his son Aperahama Taonui, Mohi Tawhai, Arama Karaka Pi and Nōpera Panakareao. F. E. Maning, Jacky Marmon and John Webster, of Opononi, Hokianga were three Pākehā Māori (a European turned native) who volunteered to fight with Nene and fought alongside the warriors from Hokianga. Webster used a rifle (a novel weapon at that time) and had made two hundred cartridges.

The colonial forces under the command of Lieutenant Colonel William Hulme arrived at Heke's pā at Puketutu on 7 May 1845. Lieutenant Colonel Hulme and his second in command Major Cyprian Bridge made an inspection of the pā and found it to be quite formidable. Lacking any better plan they decided on a frontal assault the following day. The attack was a failure and the forces retreated to the Bay of Islands. Lieutenant Colonel Hulme returned to Auckland and was replaced by Lieutenant Colonel Henry Despard, a soldier who did very little to inspire any confidence in Wāka Nene.

== Nene's defeat of Heke on 12 June 1845 at Pukenui ==
After the successful defence of Puketutu Pā on the shores of Lake Ōmāpere, Hōne Heke returned to his pā at Te Ahuahu. Te Ahuahu was a short distance from both Heke's Pā at Puketutu and the site of the later Battle of Ōhaeawai. Some days later he went on to Kaikohe to gather food supplies. During his absence one of Tāmati Wāka Nene's allies, the Hokianga chief, Makoare Te Taonui (the father of Aperahama Taonui), attacked and captured Te Ahuahu. This was a tremendous blow to Heke's mana or prestige, obviously it had to be recaptured as soon as possible.

The ensuing battle was a traditional formal Māori conflict, taking place in the open with the preliminary challenges and responses. By Māori standards, the battle was considerably large. Heke mustered somewhere between 400 and 500 warriors while Tāmati Wāka Nene had about 300 men. Hōne Heke lost at least 30 warriors. Hugh Carleton (1874) provides a brief description of the battle:

Heke committed the error (against the advice of Pene Taui) of attacking Walker [Tāmati Wāka Nene], who had advanced to Pukenui. With four hundred men, he attacked about one hundred and fifty of Walker's party, taking them also by surprise; but was beaten back with loss. Kahakaha was killed, Haratua was shot through the lungs

Rev. Richard Davis also recorded that a

sharp battle was fought on the 12th inst. between the loyal and disaffected natives. The disaffected, although consisting of 500 men, were kept at bay all day, and ultimately driven off the field by the loyalists, although their force did not exceed 100. Three of our people fell, two on the side of the disaffected, and one on the side of the loyalists. When the bodies were brought home, as one of them was a principal chief of great note and bravery, he was laid in state, about a hundred yards from our fence, before he was buried. The troops were in the Bay at the time, and were sent for by Walker, the conquering chief; but they were so tardy in their movements that they did not arrive at the seat of war to commence operations until the 24th inst.! (Note: The comment by Rev. Richard Davis that ‘Three of our people fell’ can be assumed to be a reference to Ngāpuhi that had been baptised as Christians by the CMS mission.)

Wāka Nene remained in control of Heke's pā. Heke was severely wounded and did not rejoin the conflict until some months later, at the closing phase of the Battle of Ruapekapeka. In a letter to Lieutenant Colonel Despard the battle was described by Wāka Nene as a "most complete victory over Heke".

== Battle of Ōhaeawai ==
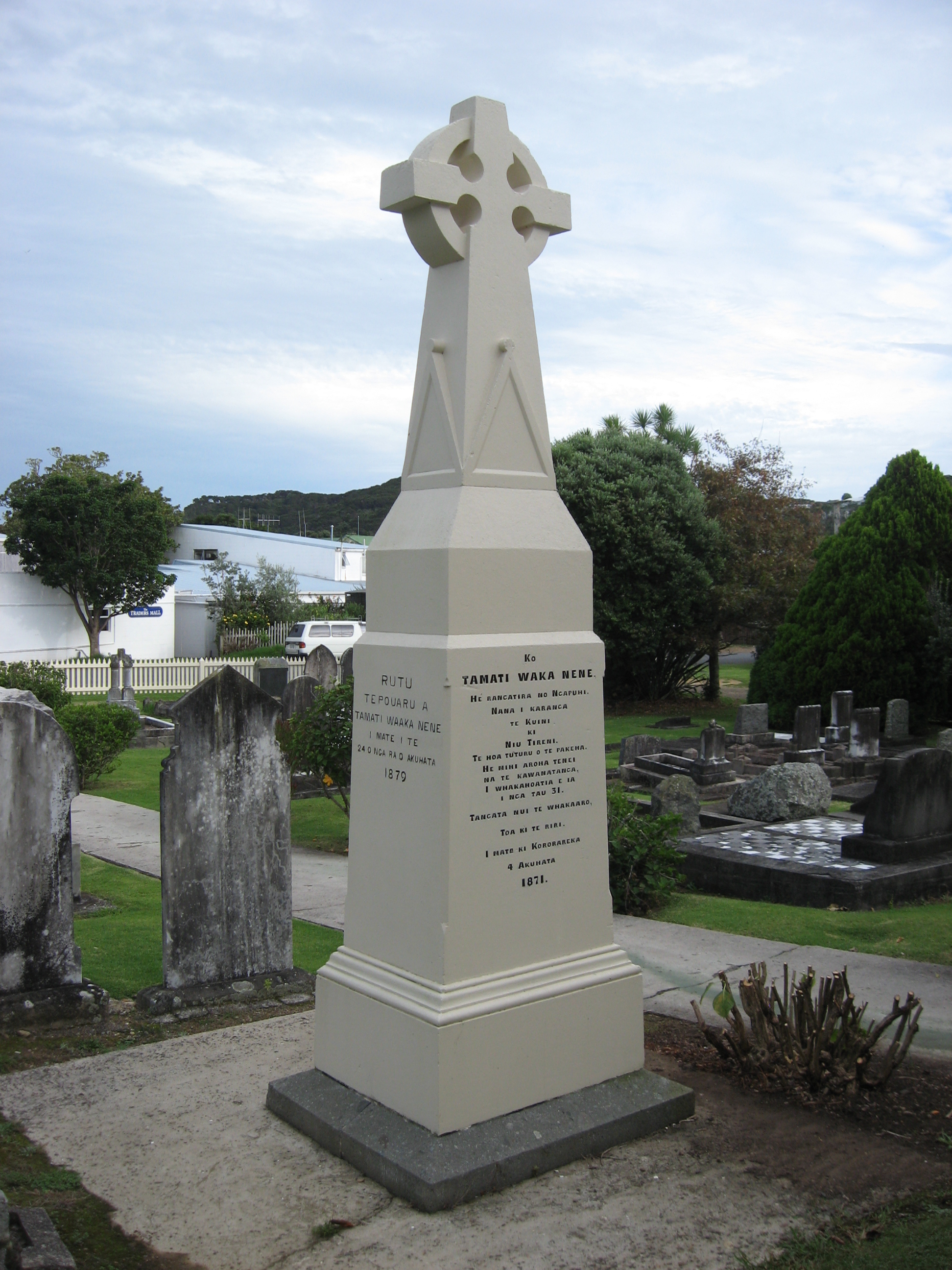
A memorial for Tāmati Wāka Nene, in front of Christ Church, Russell (Māori-language side)

Tāmati Wāka Nene and his warriors supported troops led by Lieutenant Colonel Despard in an attack on Pene Taui's pā at Ōhaeawai. Kawiti and Pene Taui had strengthened the defences of the pā.

Nene and Despard fought side by side as allies although Despard had an almost complete incomprehension about Nene's experience in attacking fortified pās. At Ōhaeawai, Nene offered to make a feint attack on the rear of the pā, to divert attention from the soldiers' assault, but this suggestion, like all others offered by Nene, met with a refusal. Nene described the British commander, Lieutenant Colonel Despard, as 'a very stupid man'. Despard on the other hand said "if I want help from savages I will ask for it". History tends to support Nene's opinion as he had achieved a decisive win against Hōne Heke on 12 June 1845, with no help from the British.

At the Battle of Ōhaeawai after two days of bombardment without effecting a breach, Despard ordered a frontal assault. He was, with difficulty, persuaded to postpone this pending the arrival of a 32-pound naval gun which came the next day, 1 July. However an unexpected sortie from the pā resulted in the temporary occupation of the knoll on which Tāmati Wāka Nene had his camp and the capture of Nene's colours – the Union Jack. The Union Jack was carried into the pā. There it was hoisted, upside down, and at half-mast high, below the Māori flag, which was a Kākahu (Māori cloak).

This insulting display of the Union Jack was the cause of the disaster which ensued. Infuriated by the insult to the Union Jack Colonel Despard ordered an assault upon the pā the same day. The attack was directed to the section of the pā where the angle of the palisade allowed a double flank from which the defenders of the pā could fire at the attackers; the attack was a reckless endeavour. The British persisted in their attempts to storm the unbreached palisades and five to seven minutes later 33 were dead and 66 injured, approximately one-third of the soldiers and Royal Marines.

== Battle of Ruapekapeka ==
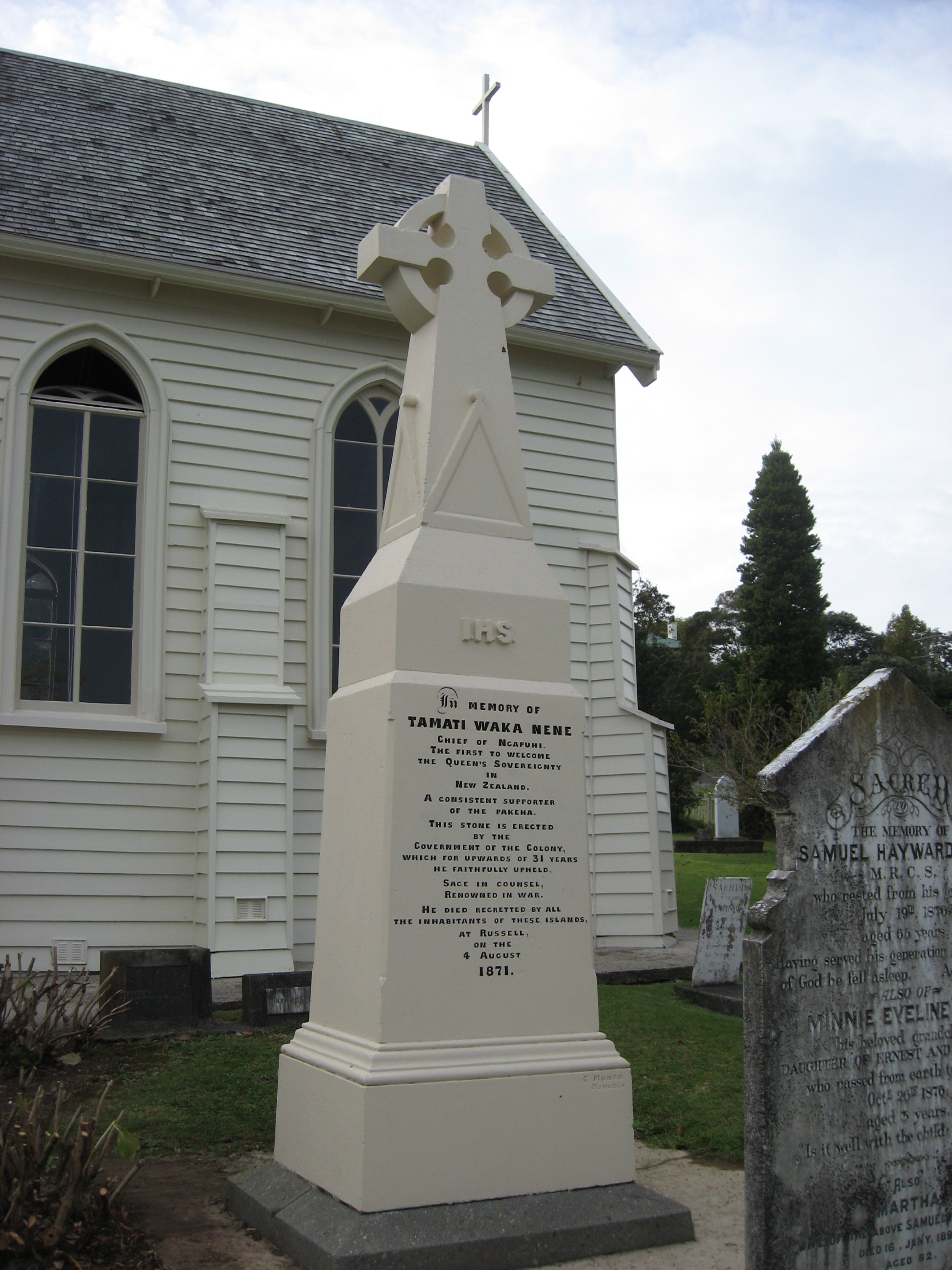
A memorial for Tāmati Wāka Nene, in front of Christ Church, Russell (English-language side)

Tāmati Wāka Nene and his warriors supported troops led by Lieutenant Colonel Despard in an attack on the pā at Ruapekapeka. Kawiti's tactics was to attempt to repeat the success of the Battle of Ōhaeawai and draw the colonial forces into an attack on heavily fortified pā. The colonial forces started a cannon bombardment of Ruapekapeka Pā on 27 December 1845. The siege continued for some two weeks with enough patrols and probes from the pā to keep everyone alert. Then, early in the morning of Sunday, 11 January 1846, Tāmati Wāka Nene's men discovered that the pā appeared to have been abandoned; although Te Ruki Kawiti and a few of his warriors remained behind, and appeared to have been caught unaware by the British assault. The assaulting force drove Kawiti and his warriors out of the pā. Fighting took place behind the pā and most casualties occurred in this phase of the battle.

After the Battle of Ruapekapeka, Heke and Kawiti were ready for peace. They approached Wāka Nene to act as the intermediary to negotiate with Governor Grey. Nene insisted that no action should be taken against Heke and Kawiti for leading the war.

== Later life ==
The Government lost a great deal of mana and influence in the North as a result of the war, much of which flowed to Nene. He and Heke were recognised as the two most influential men in the North. He was given a pension of one hundred pounds a year and had a cottage built for him in Kororareka (Russell). He continued to advise and assist the Government on matters such as the release of Pomare II in 1846 and Te Rauparaha in 1848.

When George Grey was knighted he chose Nene as one of his esquires. Then when he returned for his second term of governorship in 1860 he brought Nene a silver cup from Queen Victoria. Nene accompanied Grey to Taranaki to negotiate a truce with Wiremu Tamihana (the King maker) to end the First Taranaki War in 1861. En route to New Plymouth the ship struck a huge storm but survived which was taken as a favourable omen.

== Death ==
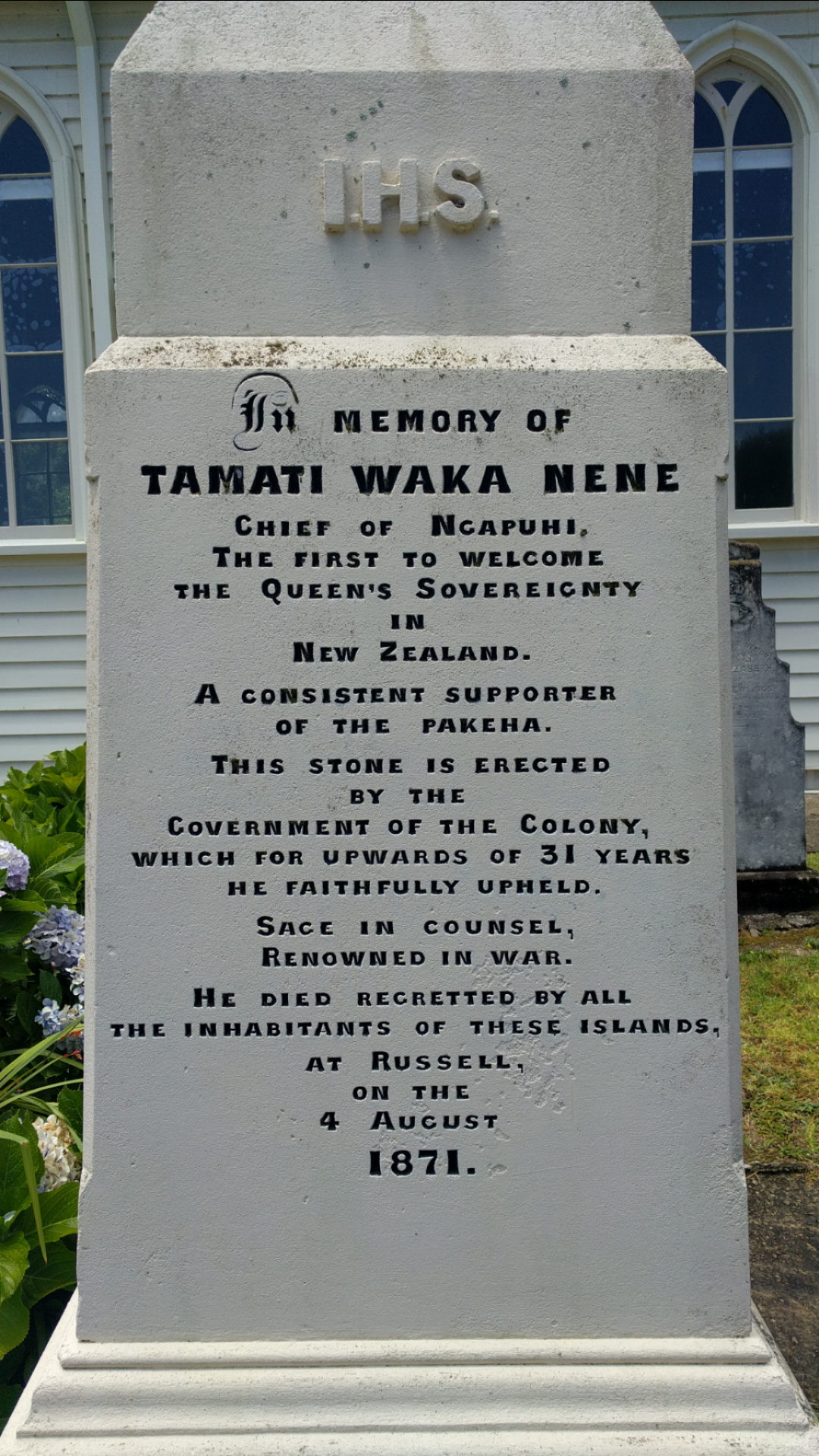
Nene's memorial gravestone in Christ Church, Russell

Tāmati Wāka Nene died on 4 August 1871, and is buried in Russell. The Governor at the time, Sir George Bowen, said that Nene did more than any other Māori to promote colonisation and to establish the Queen's authority.
