= Te Wharerahi =

New Zealand Māori rangatira (chief)

Te Wharerahi (born c. 1770) was a highly respected rangatira (chief) of the Ipipiri (Bay of Islands) area of New Zealand.

== Origins and mana ==
Aside from other connections, he was Ngati Tautahi. His mother was Te Auparo and his father Te Maoi; his brothers the chiefs Moka Te Kainga-mataa and Rewa and sister, Te Karehu. His mother and sister, Te Karehu, were both killed by a Ngare Raumati raiding party and their bodies eaten. The women were working in a keha (turnip) plantation. The war cry "Patukeha" was used when the Raupatu (Māori: "confiscation") was ordered.

Te Wharerahi married Tari, the sister of the Hokianga chiefs Eruera Maihi Patuone and Tāmati Wāka Nene. Tari, Patuone and Nene were all children of the Ngāti Hao chief Tapua and his wife Te Kawehau. In one sense, the marriage of Te Wharerahi and Tari cemented an alliance between a key hapū of the Bay of Islands and the Hokianga, just as the marriage of Tapua and Te Kawehau had done.

== Musket Wars ==
Te Wharerahi and his two brothers Rewa and Moka 'Kainga-mataa' participated in the bloody Musket Wars of the 1820s-1830s, which caused wholesale destruction across the North Island; resulting in numerous deaths, imprisonment, and the displacement of a large number of people. Te Wharerahi took part in numerous battles, such as Mokoia, Te Totara, and Matakitaki. (Elder, 1932, p. 342; & Percy Smith, 1910, pp. 218–343).

== Role and stance on the Treaty of Waitangi ==
Te Wharerahi and his two brothers were original signatories to the Declaration of the Independence of New Zealand signed at Waitangi on 28 October 1835, which guaranteed the Māori chiefs their sovereignty with this document being officially recognised by the Crown in 1836. A few years later, the Crown could see the benefits to the British Empire in gaining sovereignty over these islands and in 1839, would decide to attempt to annex New Zealand. The Crown decided to achieve this by introducing a new document which would in effect, revoke the Declaration of Independence.

Captain William Hobson was sent to New Zealand with the express aim, of ensuring that this was achieved and arrived in the Bay of Islands aboard HMS Herald on 29 January 1840. A week later, on 5 February 1840, the three brothers attended a large hui at Waitangi (400 people) where they had an opportunity to speak publicly about the agreement which would become known as the Tiriti o Waitangi or Treaty of Waitangi. Rewa and Moka vigorously opposed the signing, whilst Te Wharerahi sided with the Crown.

Rewa informed Hobson that they did not need the Crown as they were their own rulers, they held sovereignty over New Zealand, and told Hobson to go back to England. Moka then addressed Hobson and questioned him about the proclamation that he was witness to at the Christ Church on 30 January 1840 and doubted Hobson's ability to effectively enforce Crown control. Moka then publicly challenged the Reverend Charles Baker as to the land Baker had acquired and after receiving what he believed to be an unsatisfactory or unconvincing answer, accused the Europeans of being deceitful.

Later in the proceedings, "...Wharerahi, one of the most important and senior of the northern alliance chiefs, and older brother of Rewa and Moka...now spoke in support of it [Treaty]....He was the first chief to appeal to the idea that having the governor would assist in the creation of peace between the tribes..." (Phillipson, 2004, p. 247). Wharerahi said: "Is it not good to be in peace? We will have this man as our Governor. What! turn him away! Say to this man of the Queen, Go back! No, no." (Colenso, 1890, p. 23). According to Salmond (1997) '...this speech by a very powerful rangatira marked a shift in opinion at the hui.' (Phillipson, 2004, p. 247). Hokianga chiefs; Eruera Maihi Patuone and his brother Tāmati Wāka Nene, would join Wharerahi and show their support toward the Crown, by arguing for them to remain in New Zealand.

The following day, a number of chiefs including Te Wharerahi, decided to sign the Treaty and although Rewa held reservations, eventually he too would sign. However, it appears as though Moka refused to sign this document on principle.

There are a number of interesting dynamics here; Te Wharerahi was brother-in-law to Tāmati Wāka Nene and Eruera Maihi Patuone (both of which wished for peace) whilst there is a suspicion that Rewa and Moka may have been close to the Bishop Pompallier, who spoke against the signing of the Treaty to some of the Māori chiefs. William Colenso, the CMS missionary printer, in his record of the events of the signing of the Treaty of Waitangi gives an example of Bishop Pompallier's activities with a statement of the chief Te Kemara, when he signed the Treaty: "[a]fter some little time Te Kemara came towards the table and affixed his sign to the parchment, stating that the Roman Catholic bishop (who had left the meeting before any of the chiefs had signed) had told him "not to write on the paper, for if he did he would be made a slave."
