= He Whakaputanga =

1835 New Zealand sovereignty document

He Whakaputanga Declaration of the Independence of New Zealand
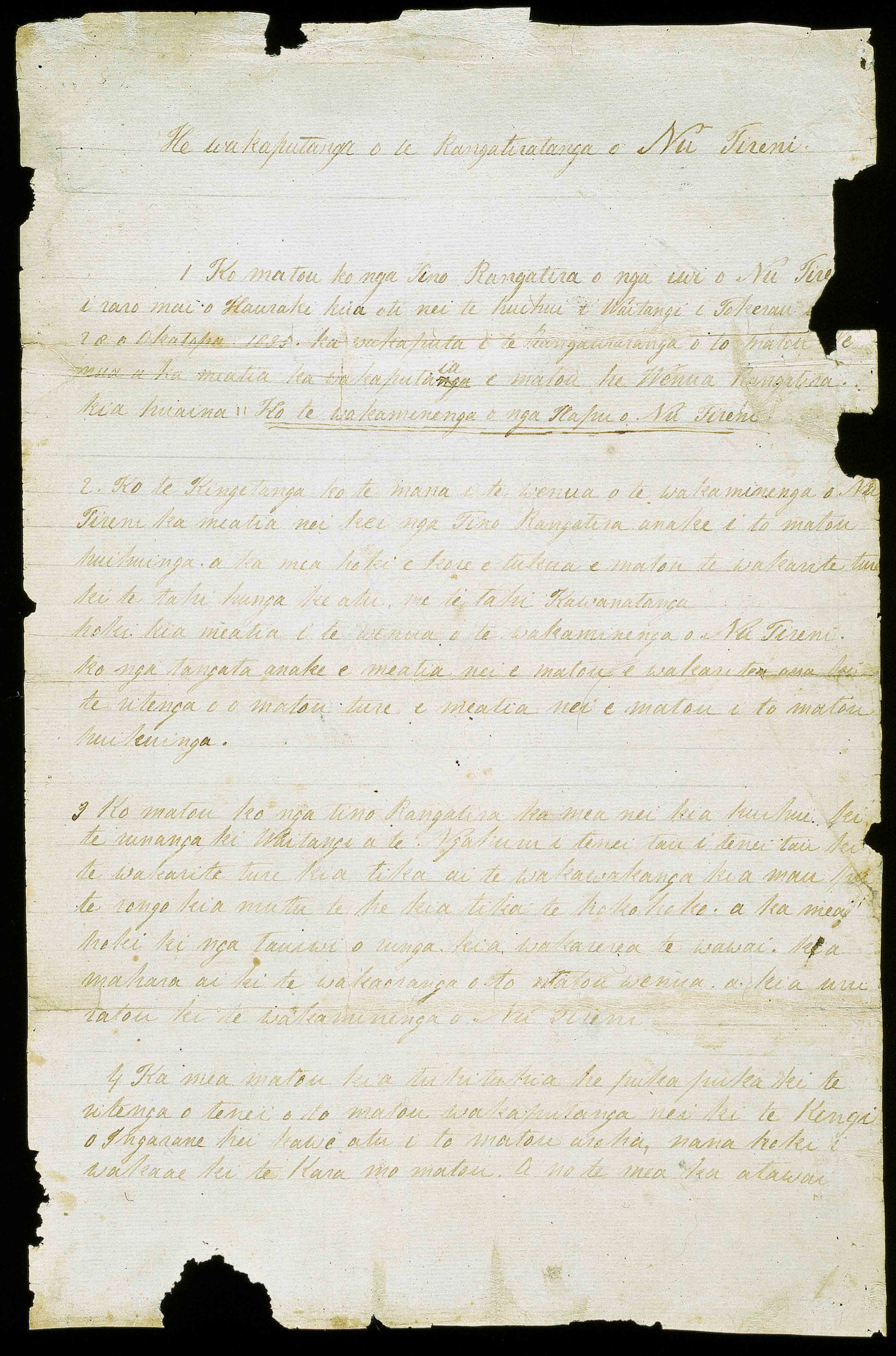
- The first page of He Whakaputanga
- Original title: He Whakaputanga o te Rangatiratanga o Nu Tireni
- Created: 28 October 1835
- Ratified: 1836
- Location: National Library of New Zealand
- Author(s): James Busby and 35 northern Māori chiefs (including Tāmati Wāka Nene and Bay of Islands brothers Te Wharerahi, Rewa, and Moka Te Kainga-mataa)
- Signatories: United Tribes of New Zealand
- Purpose: Proclaimed the sovereign independence of New Zealand

He Whakaputanga, also known as the Declaration of the Independence of New Zealand (Māori: He Whakaputanga o te Rangatiratanga o Nu Tireni) is a document signed in 1835 by a number of Māori chiefs of the northern parts of New Zealand setting out the independence of their country. It preceded the Treaty of Waitangi, which was signed in 1840.

== Background ==
On 28 October 1835, with James Busby, the British Resident in New Zealand, He Whakaputanga was signed by 34 northern Māori chiefs, including Tāmati Wāka Nene, Tītore, Te Wharerahi and Moka Te Kainga-mataa. Further signatures followed and by 1839, a total of 52 chiefs had signed.

In the process of signing, the chiefs established themselves as representing a confederation under the title of the "United Tribes of New Zealand". Missionaries Henry Williams and George Clarke translated He Whakaputanga and signed as witnesses. Merchants James Clendon and Gilbert Mair also signed as witnesses.

He Whakaputanga arose in response to concerns over the lawlessness of British subjects in New Zealand and in response to a fear that France would declare sovereignty over the islands. A Frenchman, Charles de Thierry, who titled himself 'Charles, Baron de Tierry, Sovereign Chief of New Zealand and King of Nuku Hiva' (in the Marquesas Islands), sought to establish a colony on a 16,000-hectare (40,000-acre) plot of land that he claimed to have purchased in the Hokianga.

In 1834, some chiefs selected a flag now known as the flag of the United Tribes of New Zealand for use on ships originating from New Zealand.

The need for a flag of New Zealand first became clear when the merchant ship Sir George Murray, built in the Hokianga, was seized by customs officials in the port of Sydney. The ship had sailed without a flag, a violation of British navigation laws. New Zealand was then not a colony and had no flag. The ship's detention reportedly aroused indignation among the Māori population. Unless a flag were selected, ships would continue to be seized.

The flag, amended slightly when officially gazetted, became the first distinctive flag of New Zealand. As late as 1900, it was still being used to depict New Zealand, and it appeared on the South African War Medal that was issued to New Zealand soldiers of the Second Boer War. The original version of the flag, with eight-pointed stars and black fimbriation, is still used by some Māori groups.

He Whakaputanga is displayed at the National Library of New Zealand, as part of the He Tohu exhibition, along with the Treaty of Waitangi and the 1893 Women's Suffrage Petition.

== Text ==
The hereditary chiefs and heads of the tribes of the northern parts of New Zealand declared the constitution of an independent state. They agreed to meet in Waitangi each year to frame laws and invited the southern tribes of New Zealand to "lay aside their private animosities" and join them.

He Wakaputanga o te Rangatiratanga o Nu Tireni

1. Ko matou ko nga Tino Rangatira o nga iwi o Nu Tireni i raro mai o Hauraki kua oti nei te huihui i Waitangi i Tokerau 28 o Oketopa 1835. ka wakaputa i te Rangatiratanga o to matou wenua a ka meatia ka wakaputaia e matou he Wenua Rangatira. kia huaina ‘Ko te Wakaminenga o nga Hapu o Nu Tireni’.

2. Ko te Kingitanga ko te mana i te wenua o te wakaminenga o Nu Tireni ka meatia nei kei nga Tino Rangatira anake i to matou huihuinga. a ka mea hoki e kore e tukua e matou te wakarite ture ki te tahi hunga ke atu, me te tahi Kawanatanga hoki kia meatia i te wenua o te wakaminenga o Nu Tireni. ko nga tangata anake e meatia nei e matou e wakarite ana ki te ritenga o o matou ture e meatia nei e matou i to matou huihuinga.

3. Ko matou ko nga Tino Rangatira ke mea nei kia huihui ki te runanga ki Waitangi a te Ngahuru i tenei tau i tenei tau ki te wakarite ture kia tika ai te wakawakanga kia mau pu te rongo kia mutu te he kia tika te hokohoko. a ka mea hoki ki nga Tauiwi o runga kia wakarerea te wawai. kia mahara ai ki te wakaoranga o to matou wenua. a kia uru ratou ki te wakaminenga o Nu Tireni.

4. Ka mea matou kia tuhituhia he pukapuka ki te ritenga o tenei o to matou wakaputanga nei ki te Kingi o Ingarani hei kawe atu i to matou aroha. nana hoki i wakaae ki te Kara mo matou. a no te mea ka atawai matou, ka tiaki i nga pakeha e noho nei i uta e rere mai ana ki te hokohoko, koia ka mea ai matou ki te Kingi kia waiho hei matua ki a matou i to matou Tamarikitanga kei wakakahoretia to matou Rangatiratanga.

Kua wakaetia katoatia e matou i tenei ra i te 28 o opketopa 1835 ki te aroaro o te Reireneti o te Kingi o Ingarani.

The Codicil
Ko matou ko nga Rangatira ahakoa kihai i tae ki te huihuinga nei no te nuinga o te Waipuke no te aha ranei – ka wakaae katoa ki te waka putanga Rangatiratanga o Nu Tirene a ka uru ki roto ki te Wakaminenga.

Translation:

He Wakaputanga o te Rangatiratanga o Nu Tireni

1. We, the absolute leaders of the tribes (iwi) of New Zealand (Nu Tireni) to the north of Hauraki (Thames) having assembled in the Bay of Islands (Tokerau) on 28th October 1835. [We] declare the authority and leadership of our country and say and declare them to be prosperous economy and chiefly country (Wenua Rangatira) under the title of ‘Te Wakaminenga o ngā Hapū o Nu Tireni’ (The sacred Confederation of Tribes of New Zealand).

2. The sovereignty/kingship (Kīngitanga) and the mana from the land of the Confederation of New Zealand are here declared to belong solely to the true leaders (Tino Rangatira) of our gathering, and we also declare that we will not allow (tukua) any other group to frame laws (wakarite ture), nor any Governorship (Kawanatanga) to be established in the lands of the Confederation, unless (by persons) appointed by us to carry out (wakarite) the laws (ture) we have enacted in our assembly (huihuinga).

3. We, the true leaders have agreed to meet in a formal gathering (rūnanga) at Waitangi in the autumn (Ngahuru) of each year to enact laws (wakarite ture) that justice may be done (kia tika ai te wakawakanga), so that peace may prevail and wrong-doing cease and trade (hokohoko) be fair. [We] invite the southern tribes to set aside their animosities, consider the well-being of our land and enter into the sacred Confederation of New Zealand.

4. We agree that a copy of our declaration should be written and sent to the King of England to express our appreciation (aroha) for this approval of our flag. And because we are showing friendship and care for the Pākehā who live on our shores, who have come here to trade (hokohoko), we ask the King to remain as a protector (matua) for us in our inexperienced statehood (tamarikitanga), lest our authority and leadership be ended (kei whakakahoretia tō mātou Rangatiratanga).

The Codicil
We are the rangatira who, although we did not attend the meeting due to the widespread flooding or other reasons, fully agree with He Whakaputanga Rangatiratanga o Nu Tirene and join the sacred Confederation.

— Modern translation by Dr Mānuka Hēnare

The original English text, as was drafted by James Busby and sent to the New South Wales government and the Colonial Office in Britain is as follows:

Declaration of Independence of New Zealand

1. We, the hereditary chiefs and heads of the tribes of the Northern parts of New Zealand, being assembled at Waitangi, in the Bay of Islands, on this 28th day of October, 1835, declare the Independence of our country, which is hereby constituted and declared to be an Independent State, under the designation of The United Tribes of New Zealand.

2. All sovereign power and authority within the territories of the United Tribes of New Zealand is hereby declared to reside entirely and exclusively in the hereditary chiefs and heads of tribes in their collective capacity, who also declare that they will not permit any legislative authority separate from themselves in their collective capacity to exist, nor any function of government to be exercised within the said territories, unless by persons appointed by them, and acting under the authority of laws regularly enacted by them in Congress assembled.

3. The hereditary chiefs and heads of tribes agree to meet in Congress at Waitangi in the autumn of each year, for the purpose of framing laws for the dispensation of justice, the preservation of peace and good order, and the regulation of trade; and they cordially invite the Southern tribes to lay aside their private animosities and to consult the safety and welfare of our common country, by joining the Confederation of the United Tribes.

4. They also agree to send a copy of this Declaration to His Majesty, the King of England, to thank him for his acknowledgement of their flag; and in return for the friendship and protection they have shown, and are prepared to show, to such of his subjects as have settled in their country, or resorted to its shores for the purposes of trade, they entreat that he will continue to be the parent of their infant State, and that he will become its Protector from all attempts upon its independence.

Agreed to unanimously on this 28 day of October, 1835, in the presence of His Britannic Majesty’s Resident.

(Here follows the signatures or marks of thirty-five Hereditary chiefs or Heads of tribes, which form a fair representation of the tribes of New Zealand from the North Cape to the latitude of the River Thames.) English witnesses: (Signed) Henry Williams, Missionary, C.M.S. George Clarke, C.M.S. James R. Clendon, Merchant. Gilbert Mair, Merchant.

I certify that the above is a correct copy of the Declaration of the Chiefs, according to the translation of Missionaries who have resided ten years and upwards in the country; and it is transmitted to His Most Gracious Majesty the King of England, at the unanimous request of the chiefs.

(Signed) JAMES BUSBY, British Resident at New Zealand.

Flag of the United Tribes of New Zealand

The original design of the flag, with eight-pointed stars and black fimbriation, is today widely used by Māori groups.

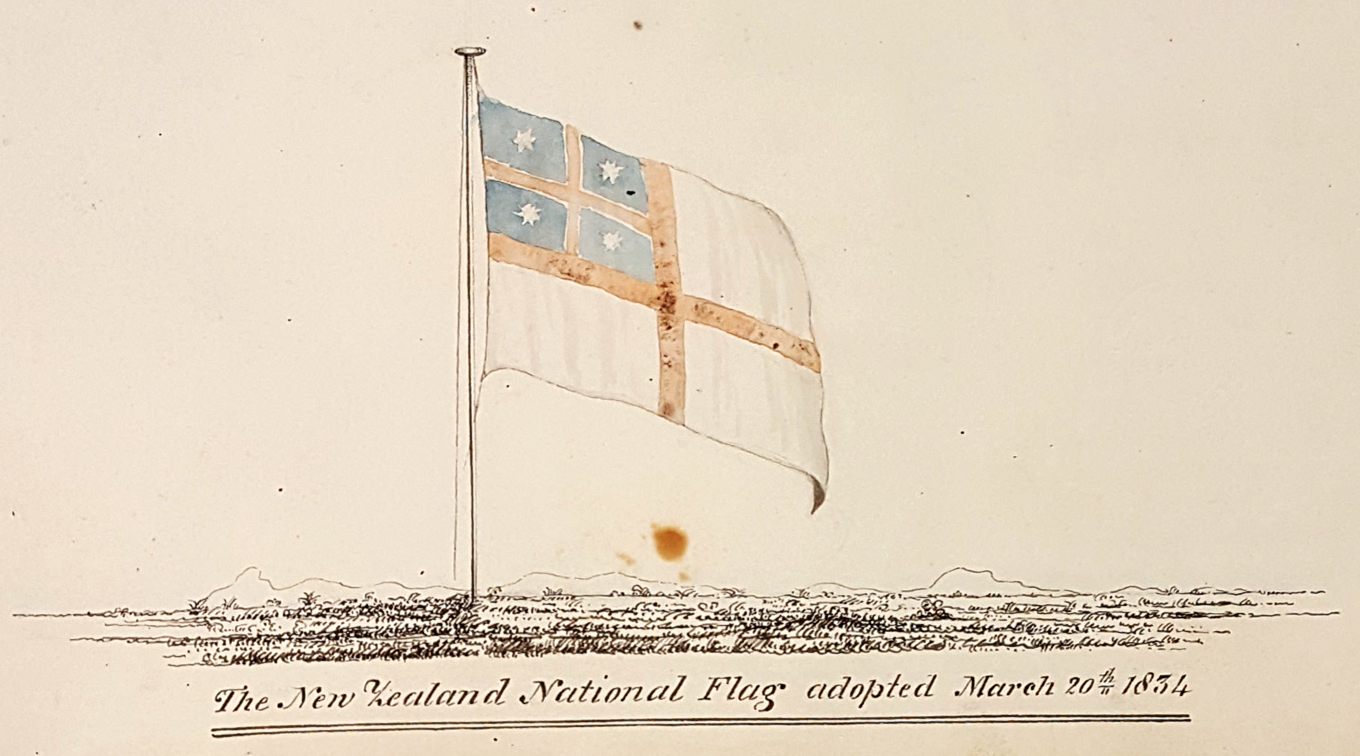
The flag as drawn by Nicholas Charles Phillips of the man-of-war HMS Alligator in 1834

=== Explanation of Māori text ===
The Māori text of He Whakaputanga was made by the tino rangatira (hereditary chiefs) of the northern part of New Zealand. It uses the term Rangatiratanga to mean independence and declares the country a whenua Rangatira (independent state) that is to be known as the United Tribes of New Zealand (Te Wakaminenga o nga Hapu o Nu Tireni).

The translation of the second paragraph is "that all sovereign power and authority in the land" ("Ko te Kingitanga ko te mana i te wenua") should "reside entirely and exclusively in the hereditary chiefs and heads of tribes in their collective capacity", expressed as the United Tribes of New Zealand.

The terms Kingitanga and mana are used in claiming sovereignty of the state to the assembly of the hereditary chiefs, and it is declared that no government (kawanatanga) would exist except by persons appointed by the assembly of hereditary chiefs.

== Impact ==
The signatories sent a copy of the document to King William IV (who reigned from 1830 to 1837), asking him to act as the protector of the new state. The King had acknowledged the flag of the United Tribes of New Zealand and now recognised the declaration in a letter from Lord Glenelg (British Secretary of State for War and the Colonies), following consideration of the declaration by the House of Lords, dated 25 May 1836.

It read, in part:

I have received a letter from Mr. Busby, enclosing a copy of a Declaration made by the chiefs of the Northern parts of New Zealand, setting forth the Independence of their country, and declaring the Union of their respective tribes into one State, under the designation of The United Tribes of New Zealand.

I perceive that the chiefs at the same time came to the resolution to send a copy of their Declaration to His Majesty, to thank him for his acknowledgment of their Flag, and to entreat that, in return for the friendship and protection which they have shown, and are prepared to show, to such British subjects as have settled in their country or resorted to its shores for the purposes of trade, His Majesty will continue to be the parent of their infant State, and its Protector from all attempts on its independence.

With reference to the desire which the chiefs have expressed on this occasion to maintain a good understanding with His Majesty's subjects, it will be proper that they should be assured, in His Majesty's name, that He will not fail to avail himself of every opportunity of showing his goodwill, and of affording to those chiefs such support and protection as may be consistent with a due regard to the just rights of others, and to the interests of His Majesty's subjects.

— Lord Glenelg, in a letter to Major-General Sir Richard Bourke, Governor of New South Wales, 25 May 1836.

He Whakaputanga was not well received by the Colonial Office, and it was decided that a new policy for New Zealand was needed as a corrective.

It is notable that the Treaty of Waitangi was made between the British Crown and "the chiefs of the United Tribes of New Zealand" in recognition of their independent sovereignty.

== Legal effects ==
Some historians argue that He Whakaputanga had limited significance and was primarily an attempt by James Busby to portray a settled form of government, one that did not then exist. Michael King said the declaration "had no reality, since there was...no national indigenous power structure", and Claudia Orange noted that "there was no indigenous power structure...upon which to base a national congress".

Māori unity movements have looked to the document as the basis for Māori claims to self-determination that reaffirmed tikanga Māori and Māori concepts of power and decision-making.

=== Ngāpuhi Waitangi Tribunal claim (Te Paparahi o te Raki inquiry) ===
In 2010, the Waitangi Tribunal began hearing Ngāpuhi's claim that sovereignty was not ceded in their signing of the Treaty of Waitangi. The Tribunal, in their Te Paparahi o Te Raki inquiry (Wai 1040), is in the process of considering the Māori and Crown understandings of the declaration and the treaty. That aspect of the inquiry raises issues as to the nature of sovereignty and whether the Māori signatories to the Treaty of Waitangi intended to transfer sovereignty.

The first stage of the report was released in November 2014, and found that Māori chiefs never agreed to give up their sovereignty when they signed the Treaty of Waitangi in 1840. Tribunal manager Julie Tangaere said at the report's release to the Ngapuhi claimants:

Your tupuna [ancestors] did not give away their mana at Waitangi, at Waimate, at Mangungu. They did not cede their sovereignty. This is the truth you have been waiting a long time to hear.

Final submissions were received in May 2018, but the second stage of the report was still in the process of being written up as of June 2020.

== Memory of the World ==
The physical sheets of the 1835 handwritten declaration and 1837 print copy are held by Archives New Zealand. In 2015, the documents were added to the UNESCO Memory of the World Aotearoa New Zealand Ngā Mahara o te Ao register.

== See also ==
- Independence of New Zealand
