= Rāhiri =

Rāhiri (estimated to have lived sometime between 1475 and 1585) is the tūpuna (ancestor) of Ngāpuhi of Northland and Ngāti Rāhiri Tumutumu of the Hauraki District in New Zealand. The Ngāpuhi today is the largest Māori iwi (tribe) in New Zealand.

Rāhiri's significance for Ngāpuhi is that all the chiefly lines of descent in Ngāpuhi trace descent through him. As the saying goes:

Mehemea he uri koe no Ngāpuhi, kihai e koe i heke ia Rāhiri, he hoiho ke koe! (If you are Ngāpuhi and do not descend from Rāhiri, then you are a horse!)

== Biography ==
Rāhiri lived some time in the period 1475–1585, based on whakapapa (genealogical) calculations. He traced descent from Kupe of the Matawhaorua canoe and Nukutawhiti of the enlarged and renamed Ngātokimatawhaorua canoe. He was the son of Tauramoko and Te Hauangiangi, and was born at Whiria pā, near Opononi in the Hokianga.

His first wife was Ahuaiti from Pouerua. From this union came the first-born son, Uenuku. Uenuku was also known as Uenuku-kuare (Uenuku who was not blessed upon birth due to the ignorance of those accompanying his mother): while still a young boy, together with his mother Ahuaiti, he was cast out by Rāhiri and it was only when he was a young man that he was reconciled with his father Rāhiri. Ahuaiti had allegedly given her visiting brothers some of Rāhiri's best fern root, contrary to his instructions to her. This was the reason for her exile. Rāhiri's second wife was Whakaruru and from this union came Kaharau who, together with Uenuku founded the military might of Ngāpuhi.

Upon reconciliation, the then territories of Ngāpuhi were divided up by Rāhiri on the basis of the flight and landing place of the kite, Tuhoronuku. Uenuku and Kaharau further consolidated connection through marriage of children.

Rāhiri had other wives, two being Moetonga and Paru, descendants of these wives respectively settling the west and east coasts within Ngāpuhi-controlled territories, creating hapū in those places.
