= Albert Barracks =

Former military installation in Auckland, New Zealand

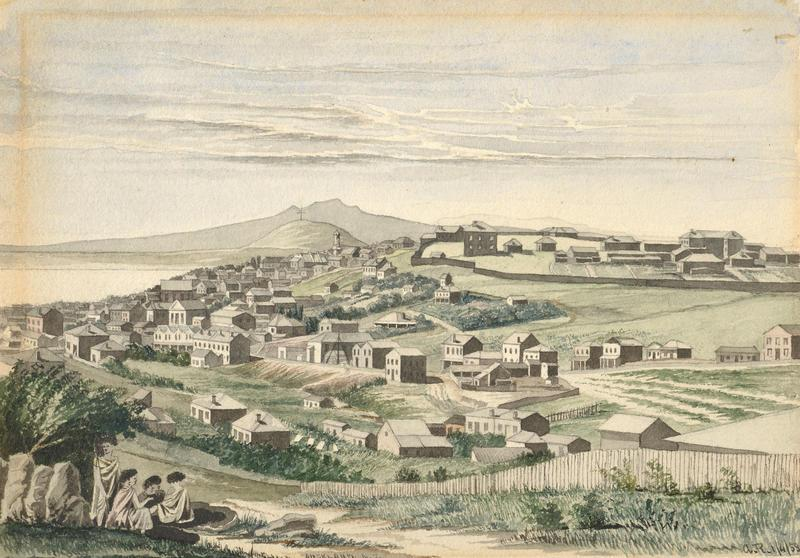
- Watercolour of the Albert Barracks in 1859
- Interactive map of the Albert Barracks area

General information
- Location: Alfred Street; Auckland; New Zealand
- Coordinates: 36°51′4.21″S 174°46′11.24″E
- Completed: 1850

Heritage New Zealand – Category 1
- Designated: 23 June 1983
- Reference no.: 12

The Albert Barracks was a major British military installation that overlooked Auckland, New Zealand, from the mid-1840s to 1870, during the city's early colonial period. The perimeter wall was built between 1846 and the early 1850s, in the area now bounded by Kitchener Street, Waterloo Quadrant, Symonds Street, and Wellesley Street East, according to Colonel Thomas Rawlings Mould's 1860 map of Defensible Works round Auckland. The site is now mostly occupied by Albert Park and the University of Auckland's City Campus, and Princes Street runs through the centre of it. All that remains of the barracks structures is part of the perimeter wall, which is on the university campus.

== Construction ==
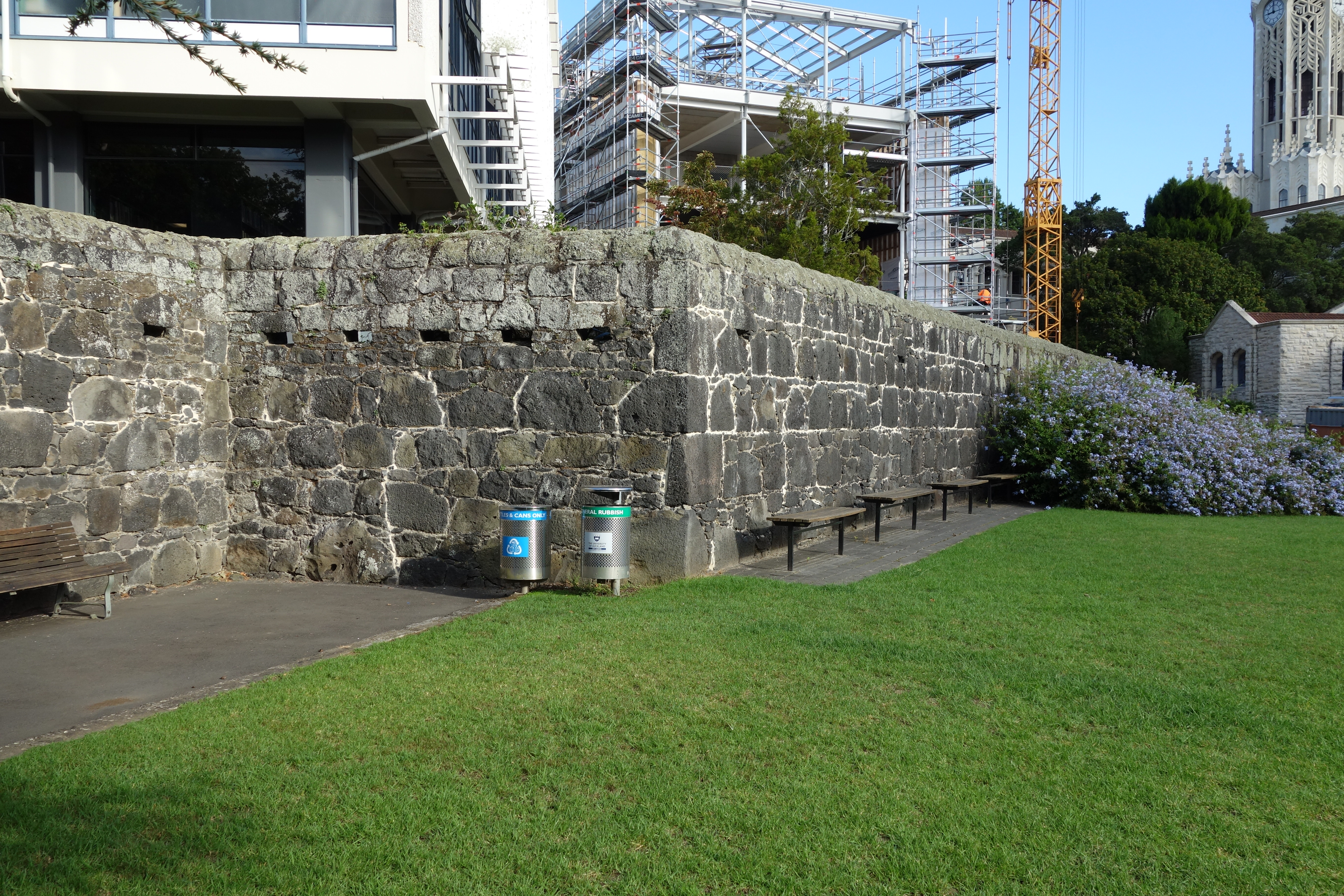
Albert Barracks wall remnant in 2016

The fortification was built to reassure the people of Auckland following the 1845–1846 Flagstaff War in the Bay of Islands; at the time, Auckland was the capital of New Zealand. Prior to this, Fort Britomart, a headland on the Waitematā Harbour adjacent to the town of Auckland served as the base of military operations.

A loopholed defensible wall had been proposed by the Commanding Royal Engineer, Captain George Augustus Bennett, as the barracks developed before his death in April 1845. It was built under the direction of his replacement, Major William Biddlecomb Marlow, RE, and the supervision of Clerk of Works George Graham, enclosing the 22 acres (8.9 ha) site. Tenders were called for construction of the perimeter wall on 18 December 1846. Construction of the scoria wall with stone quarried from Engineer Quarry in Mount Eden was undertaken by both Europeans and local Maori under Graham's supervision. As this type of construction was new to Maori, training was given to them, with the result that "it would be difficult to point out any marked difference between them and the work performed by the Europeans". The speed and quality of the work encouraged the Europeans employing Maori to set up a night school to provide them with additional training. In addition, a skills based pay structure was introduced for them with three steps from entrance class at two shillings per day, 2nd class at two shillings and six pence, and those who were proficient three shillings and six pence per day. European stonemasons earned between six and eight shillings per day.

During the same period, a number of buildings were constructed inside the wall, including ordinance halls, hospital, theatre, a magazine for storing powder and a military reading room. There was also a large parade ground. The original hospital was a single-story building constructed from stone blocks, similar to those used for the barracks wall. It accommodated about 50 patients in six wards. With the Invasion of the Waikato in 1863 the hospital could not cope with demand and several wooden houses were used as temporary hospitals for the overflow. The hospital buildings included a medical store and a kitchen block.

In 1866 the magazine was moved to Mount Eden stockade, beside Mount Eden Prison.

== Military units ==
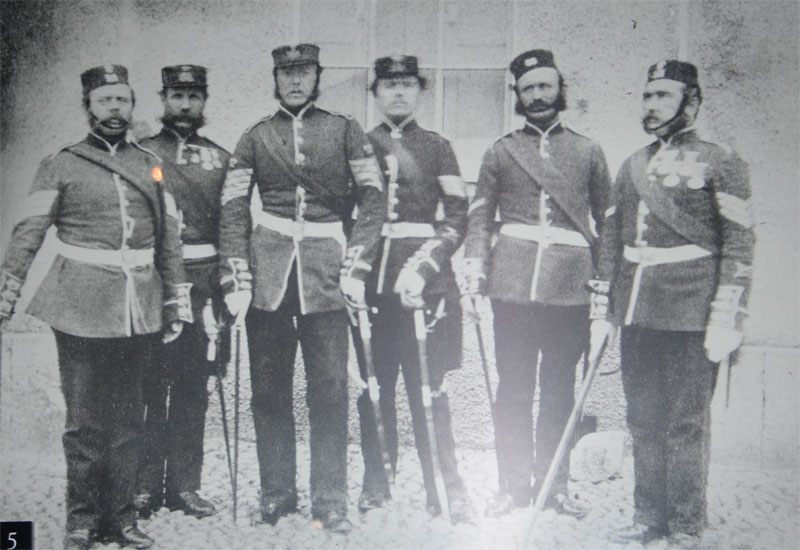
58th Regiment NCOs

Troops of the 65th Regiment were the first stationed at Albert Barracks. In 1849 they were replaced by the 58th Regiment under Lieutenant Colonel Robert Wynyard. In August 1855 a detachment of the 58th Regiment (273 troops) under Major Charles Nugent was sent to Taranaki on the Duke of Portland. Tensions had been growing there over land sales and New Plymouth was deemed vulnerable to attack by local Maori.

The Auckland Volunteer Rifles were formed in 1858 and used the Albert Barracks for training. In October 1858 the 65th Regiment under Colonel Charles Emilius Gold returned to Auckland from Wellington. The 58th Regiment departed for England on the Mary Ann in November. In March 1860, 200 men of the 65th Regiment were transferred on the steamer Airdale to Taranaki to reinforce the garrison there. The troops' arrival and occupation of the Waitara block became the commencement of the First Taranaki War. On 1 May 1860 the Auckland Militia were called to assemble at Albert Barracks. The Auckland Militia Regiment consisted of four Battalions, one based in Auckland, one at Onehunga, one at Otahuhu, and one on the North Shore. The Auckland Battalion was based at Albert Barracks and consisted of five companies. In June 1860 more troops from the 65th Regiment and a party of Royal Engineers arrived from Sydney on the Nugget. In November 1860 the 65th Regiment departed and was replaced by the 2nd Battalion of 14th Regiment, who arrived on the steam ship Robert Lowe and the Boanerges. They were joined on 22 January 1861 by a detachment from the 57th Regiment who had arrived from Bombay on the Castilian. The remainder of the 57th from the Castilian had been dispatched to New Plymouth on HM steam sloop Cordelia from Onehunga. The 65th returned to Albert Barracks from Waitara in April 1861. By May they numbered 800 men under Colonel Alfred F W Wyatt, along with some 200 men of the Royal Artillery and about 50 men from the Royal Engineers. The Royal Artillery had stables constructed either in or near the Barracks. These units remained until February 1862 when the barracks were guarded by the local militia. In 1863, 340 soldiers of the 40th Regiment were housed at the barracks. They in turn were replaced by two companies (120 men) of the 65th in May 1863. In November the 50th Regiment was at the barracks, having followed the 18th Regiment to New Zealand. Almost all the troops were deployed to areas of conflict during the Waikato invasion, Tauranga Campaign, and the Second Taranaki War, with various units coming and going as they were redeployed to other areas.

From 1865 the various Imperial forces began to leave New Zealand, its defense being completely placed in the hands of the local militias by July/August 1867. The final Imperial Troops stationed in New Zealand were the 2nd Battalion of the 18th Regiment. They were housed at the Barracks until their departure in February 1870 on SS Hero, the land and buildings being gifted to the New Zealand Government by the British government.

== Events ==
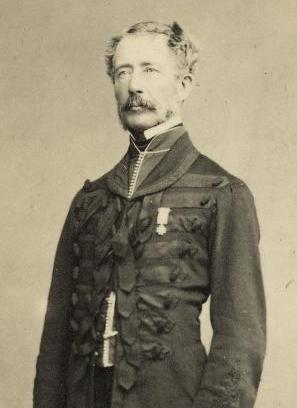
Col Thomas Mould, RE

The grounds were used a cricket venue in 1848 and the buildings, at various times from 1849, for balls and theatrical performances.

In 1849 the crew of the shipwrecked French National Corvette L Alceme were housed at the barracks for seven weeks while awaiting repatriation.

Up to 1857 Auckland had relied on septic tanks for sewage disposal, but these were no longer suitable given the growing population. Albert Barracks with its 1,000 residents compounded the problem, with heavy rain causing its septic tanks to overflow and the effluent to run down through the lower city areas. The Provincial Council raised the issue with the military, Colonel Thomas Mould of the Royal Engineers, who advised that they were prepared to deal with the problem if the council were prepared to install sewer mains. A sewer main was not installed until 1863 after several outbreaks of typhoid fever in the city.

Also in 1863, a large fire passed through the central city near the barracks. Concerns were raised that had the wind veered, the fire could have set alight the powder magazines at the barracks. There was about 100 tons of powder stored there. This fire was then followed in March 1863 by a series of fires at the barracks, which were suspected to be the work of an arsonist. The fires stopped after the military imposed a curfew at the barracks.

== Demolition and transformation ==
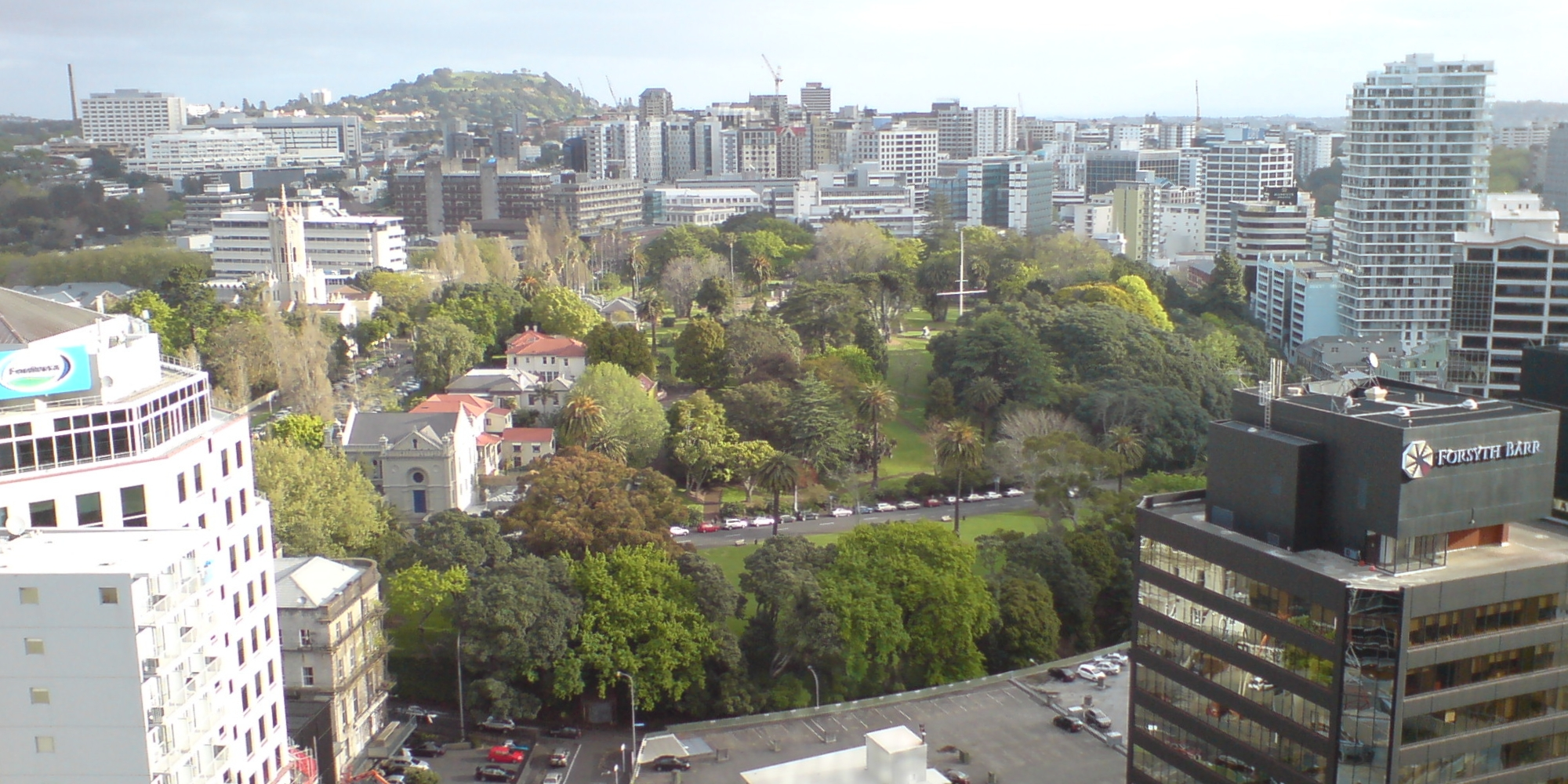
Albert Park

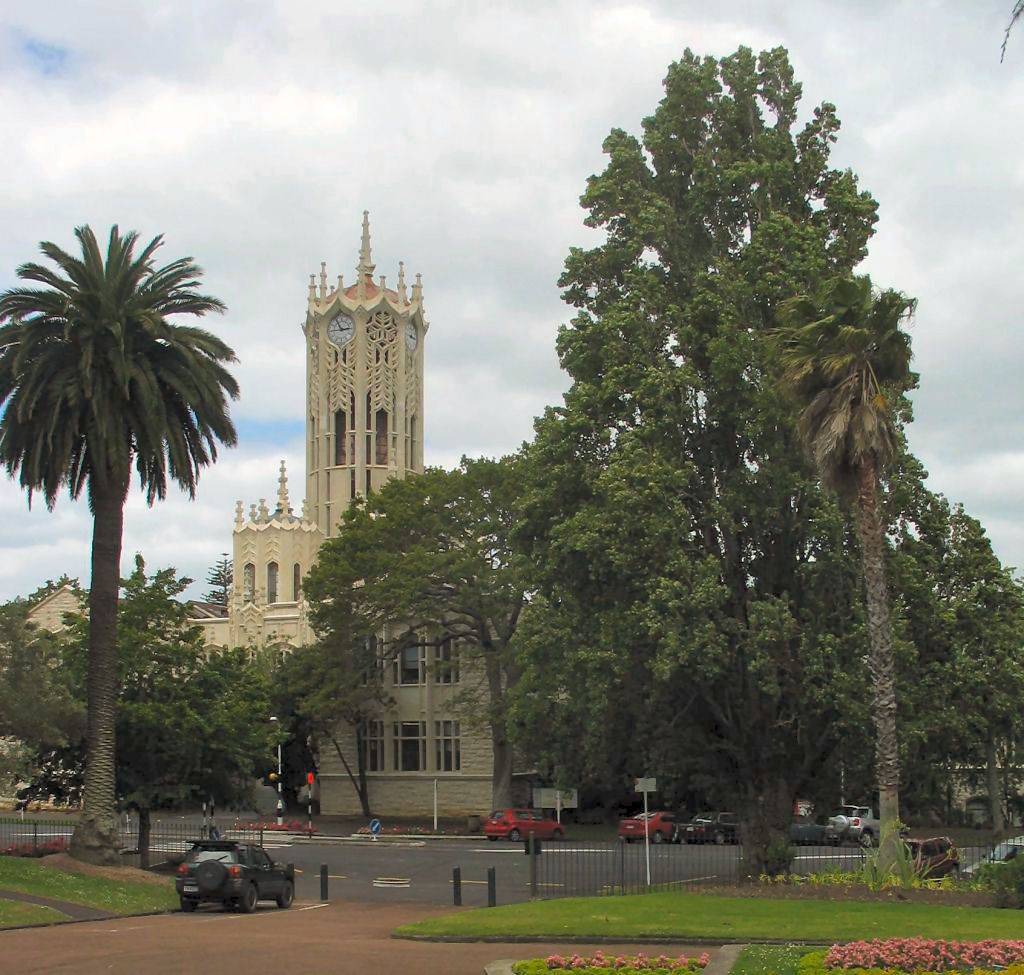
University of Auckland clock tower building viewed from Albert Park

With the departure of the 18th Regiment in 1870 some of the buildings were auctioned for removal. The site continued to be used as a cricket ground and parade ground for the local militia while its future was debated. In 1871 Auckland Grammar School under Farquhar Macrae, Head Master, began to use a building on the site. The Government transferred the Albert Barracks land was declared Crown land under The Public Domains Act 1860 by the Auckland Military Reserves Act 1871. This clause of the Act was repealed and replaced by the Auckland Improvement (Albert Barrack Reserves) Act 1872 which vested the land in the Superintendent of the Province of Auckland. The Act set up the Auckland Improvement Commissioners to manage and dispose of the land in terms of the Act. The Act enabled them to remove the wall and buildings from the site, with the exception of the Militia Store. In 1873 the Militia Store was moved to the former hospital building on the site and vested in the Governor. The Auckland City Council took ownership of the site in 1879.

Sections of the walls began to be removed and used for other projects, such as the construction of railway culverts Mechanics Bay and the Kitchener Street retaining wall.

== The University era ==
In 1880 the role of the Improvement Commission was transferred to the Auckland City Council which in 1881 approved plans for the development of gardens and walkways for Albert Park. Auckland University College took over the grounds to the west of Government House, which included the remaining section of the Barracks Wall, under the Auckland University Site Act (1919).

The construction of the College's Arts Building (opened 1926) required the removal of a substantial section of the remaining wall. This process also involved the transfer of an historic plaque relating to the Barracks Wall and the role played by Māori in its construction. The plaque was installed in 1915 by the Auckland Civic League, a women's organisation formed in 1913 and aimed at improving the city's amenities and increasing the number of women in public office. The plaque originally stood at the intersection of the wall and the east side of Princes Street and was removed to the northwest end of the wall as it currently stands, opposite the General Library and behind Alfred Nathan House.

In 1984 the University made several changes to the wall in consultation with the New Zealand Historic Places Trust and Auckland City Council, in order to facilitate access to the growing campus and to provide recognition of the wall as an historic site. In October 1983 the plaque was so badly damaged by vandals it had to be removed. It had been a focus of complaint by Māori students and activists for some time before this because of its colonialist and imperialist connotations and had suffered considerable defacement before its final destruction.

== Present time ==
The barracks were in the area now bounded by Kitchener Street, Waterloo Quadrant, Symonds Street, and Wellesley Street East, according to Colonel Mould's 1860 map of Defensible Works round Auckland. Princes Street runs through the centre of the site, with Albert Park on the western portion and the University of Auckland on the eastern side. A synagogue was built on a section at the corner of Princes Street and Bowen Avenue in 1884–1885; it is now leased by the University and called University House.

All that remains of the barracks structures is 85 metres (279 ft) of the perimeter wall. The remnant is the oldest surviving piece of British military infrastructure in New Zealand. On 23 June 1983, the Albert Barracks Wall was registered by Heritage New Zealand as a Category I structure, with registration number 12.
