= William Biddlecomb Marlow =

English military engineer

- Born: 19 February 1794; Gosport, Hampshire
- Died: 4 January 1864 (aged 69); Anglesea Lodge, Alverstoke, Gosport
- Burial place: Alverstoke
- Spouse: Catherine Mulhollan
- Children: Benjamin William Marlow; John By Durnford Marlow
- Military career
- Allegiance: United Kingdom
- Branch: Board of Ordnance; British Army
- Years of service: 1815–1862
- Rank: Major General
- Service number: 546
- Unit: Corps of Royal Engineers
- Commands: CRE, New Zealand, 1845–47; CRE, Kilkenny District, 1851– CRE, Belfast, 1853– CRE, Jamaica, 1854–57
- Campaigns: New Zealand Wars; Flagstaff War; Ōhaeawai, 1845; Pakaraka, 1845; Ruapekapeka, 1845–46; Hutt Valley
- Awards: Brevet Major, 1846

Major General William Biddlecomb Marlow (19 February 1794 – 4 January May 1864) was an English military engineer of the Corps of Royal Engineers. In New Zealand he played key role in the battles of the Flagstaff War—Ōhaeawai, Ruapekapeka—and in the construction of Albert Barracks, Auckland.

== Early life ==
William Biddlecomb Marlow was born 19 February 1794 at Gosport, Hampshire, England, the son of Benjamin Marlow and Jane Biddlecomb. He trained at the Royal Military Academy, Woolwich, for four years and three months to 1814.

== Career ==
Gentleman Cadet Marlow was commissioned as no. 546, 2nd lieutenant in the Corps of Royal Engineers, Board of Ordnance, at Woolwich, on 1 September 1814. He was stationed at Portsmouth in 1816-17, Chatham in 1816-17 and Portsmouth in 1817-19. On 4 January 1819, he married Catherine Mulhollan at his home village of Alverstoke, Gosport, and was thereafter stationed in Ireland from March 1819 to December 1820, where at Greencastle, County Donegal, their first son Benjamin William Marlow was born in March 1820.

=== Canada ===
Assigned to Canada in May 1823, Marlow advanced to rank of lieutenant from 23 March 1825. Later that year, on 16 August, the family suffered the death of their infant daughter, Catherine, at Chambly, Quebec.

One of his more notable assignments of this period was the exploration of the Black River with Lieutenant William Mein Smith, RA, and an Indian guide in 1826. They were to examine and report on the river to its source, the country between its source, the Rice Lakes, and the Talbot River, the length of portages and most feasible methods of opening communication with the Talbot River to Lake Simcoe. From his base in Kingston on 22 September 1826, Marlow and Smith reported to Colonel John Ross Wright, RE, that the mouth of the Black River was to be found emptying in to the Matchadash or Severn River, rather than the narrows of Lake Simcoe as previously supposed, that making communication to the Ottawa River through the falls and hard granite bed of Black River would be difficult and not be easily accomplished, compared to making communication by the Talbot River with its soft limestone bed. However, a canal from the source of the Black River through the Morass and Rice Lakes to the Ottawa and Talbot Rivers could be easily achieved.

He also surveyed Chambly Basin on the Richelieu River in 1828. Second son John By Durnford Marlow was born at Bytown in 1829.

=== England ===
Back in England, Marlow was stationed in Hull from November 1828 to 1833, Chatham and the Medway District to April 1833.

=== Bermuda ===
Assigned to Bermuda between May 1833 and December 1837, he worked on Military buildings, particularly the casemated barracks on Ireland Island There, he was promoted to 2nd captain on 28 March 1837.

=== North Britain ===
From 1838 the Marlow and family were stationed at Fort George, Scotland. In February 1841, Marlow sought assignment overseas for the welfare of his family, preferably New South Wales rather than America. In consequence, he was posted to New South Wales in September 1841 the family traveling by the barque Sir Edward Paget which had departed from Cork on the 26 October 1841. Eldest daughter, Jane Mary, had married William Cruickshank, 93rd Highlanders, at Inverness on 5 June 1841.

=== New South Wales ===
Marlow and family landed at Sydney from the barque Sir Edward Paget, on 14 February 1842. The construction of the Victoria Barracks, Sydney had been underway since 1841, with the officers quarters completed in 1842, and the main barrack block destined for completion in 1846. In July 1843 Marlow and the crew of the engineer department boat, came to the rescue of an intoxicated fisherman who fallen from his dingy in the harbour during a squall, saving the fellow from drowning. Second daughter, Marianne Catherine married John Smith Burke at St Lawrence Church, Sydney, on 26 November 1844.

Dr Ludwig Leichhardt and the Marlows had become friends on the Sir Edward Paget Cork–Sydney voyage; Leichhardt thereon tutored son John Marlow and Marlow assisted Leichhardt in outfitting his 1844–45 expedition across the north of Australia, from Moreton Bay to Port Essington, for which, in appreciation, Leichhardt named the Marlow River in Far North Queensland after him.

Following promotion to captain on 24 March 1845, on 16 May, Marlow was instructed to proceed to New Zealand to relieve Captain George Augustus Bennett as Commanding Royal Engineer in New Zealand. Bennett was to therefore to proceed to Sydney for the benefit of his health, but had died on 30 April, several weeks before Marlow had received instructions. Captain Marlow embarked with the officers and troops of the 99th Regiment, for Auckland, New Zealand, on the British Sovereign on 18 May, for the emergency that had broken out at the Bay of Islands in March. Whilst abroad, in July his residence at the New Military Barracks in South Head Road, Sydney, was burgled.

=== New Zealand ===
==== Ōhaeawai ====
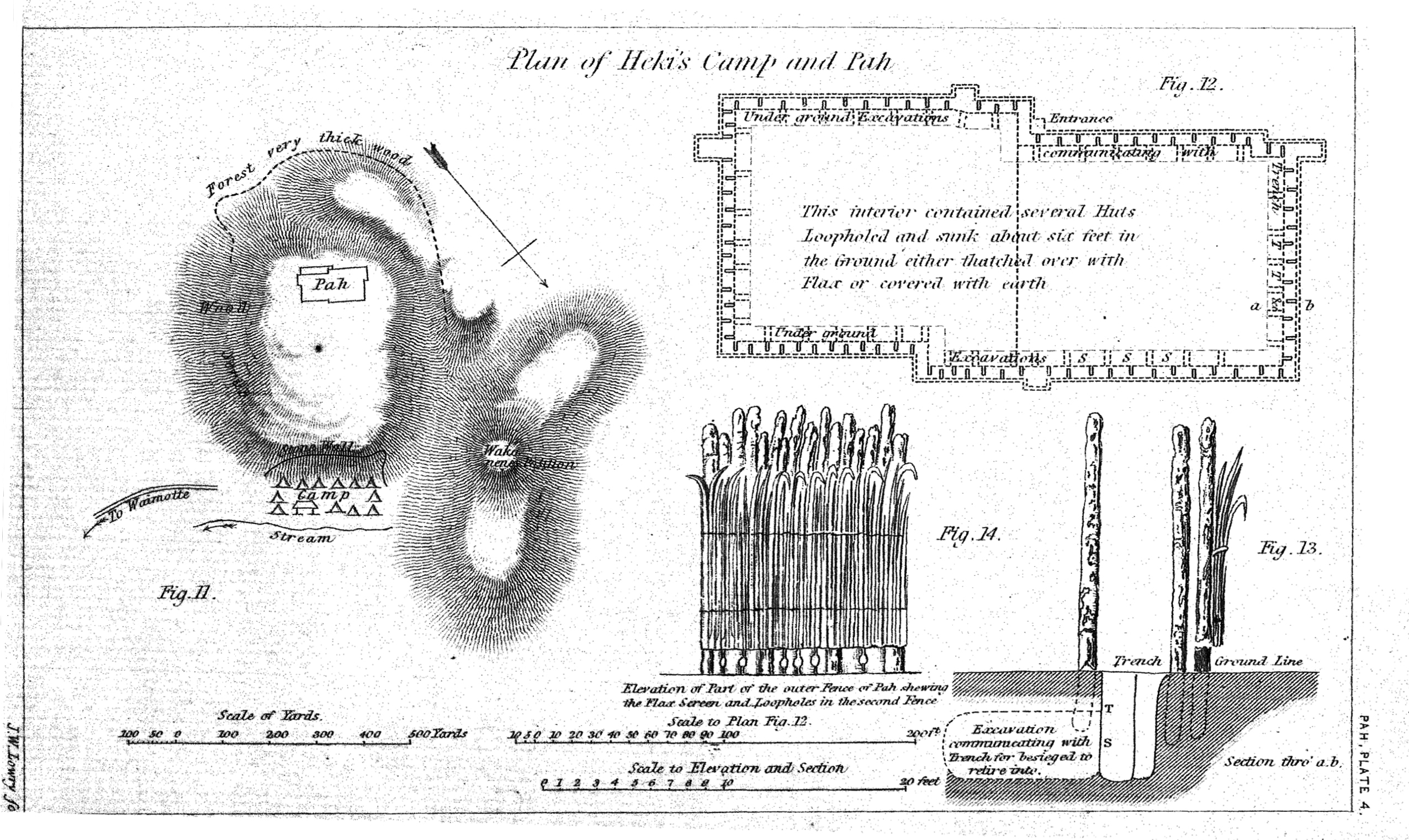
Plan of Heke's Camp and Pah, Ohaeawai, 1845

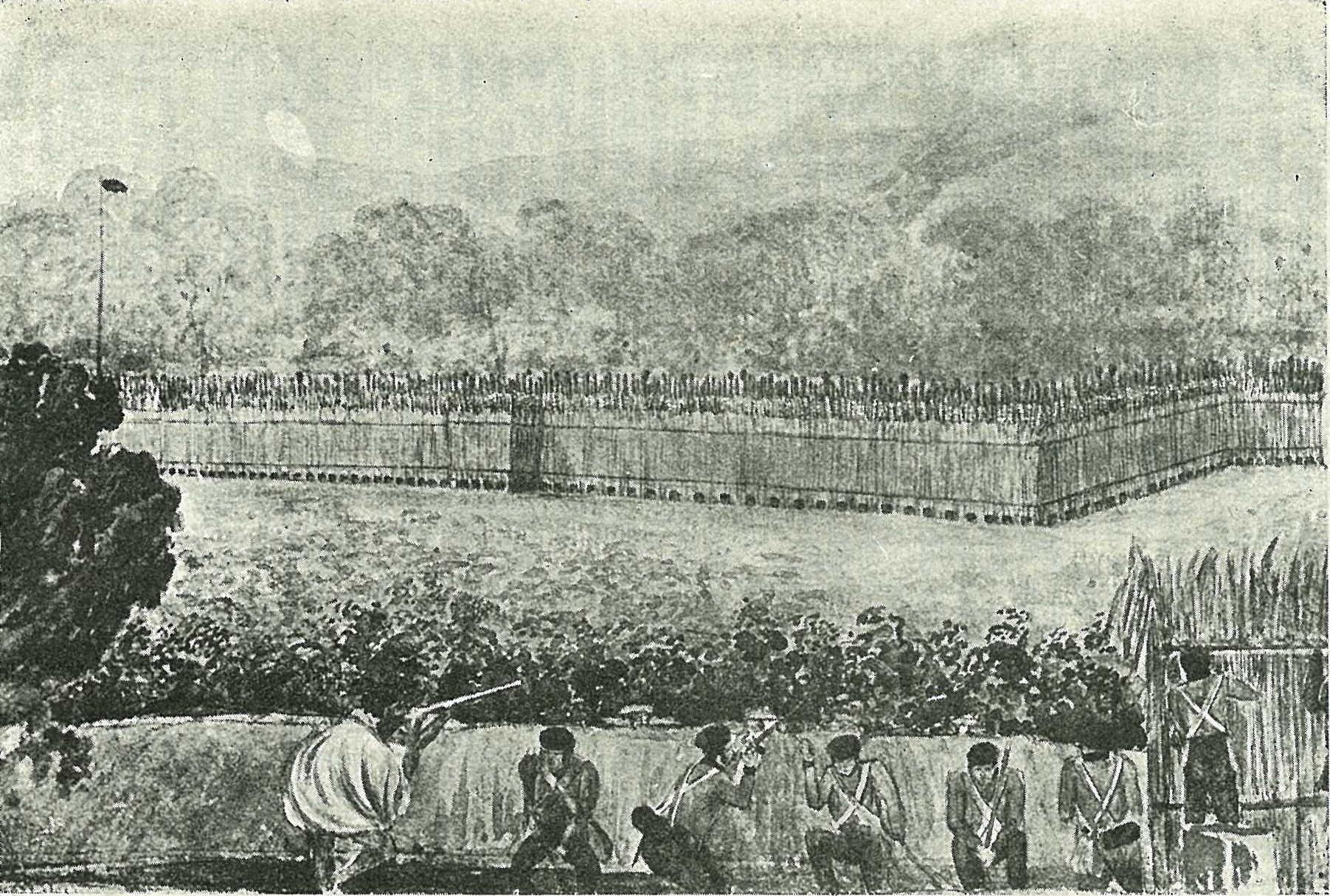
The targeted northern corner, north face and west flank, of Ōhaeawai pā from the British camp, 1845. Artist: Cyprian Bridge, 58th Regiment

British Sovereign arrived in Auckland on Sunday, 1 June 1845. Marlow's skills were immediately required in the field—Ōhaeawai in June–July 1845, Haratua's pā at Pakaraka in July, and Ruapekapeka in January 1846—with his clerk of works, George Graham, tending to military works in Auckland.

The whole military force proceeded to Kerikeri on Saturday, 14 June, in HMS Hazard and other vessels. Beating up the Bay of Islands before daylight, under hard sqaulls and poor weather, British Sovereign soon struck the Brampton reef, damaging the bottom, losing the false keel and rudder; the colour union down and firing muskets. By 10:00 am the government brig Victoria had moved to assist in removing troops including the officers—Major McPherson, 99th; Ensign Symonds, 99th; Dr Galbraith, 99th; Lieutenant Johnson, 99th, Lieutenant Beattie, 99th; Captain Marlow, RE; Lieutenant Dearing, 99th; and Henry Clarke. Having been held up for two days, they landed at Onewhero Bay on the 16 June, marched to Kerikeri, and later moved on with baggage, two 6-pounder field guns and two 12-pounder carronades on a slow march to Waimate. On the 23 June they moved on seven miles to Ohaeawai with their Māori allies. The guns were installed, fired and moved in stages up to 80 yards from the pā to improve effect, but had little effect at all and were withdrawn.

Thomas Bernard Collinson noted in 1853: "Captain Marlow considered that 12-pounder guns and 5-1/2 inch howitzers would be required to make a breach in Ohaiawai pah. It does not appear that Lieutenant Bennett's recommendations were attended to, for no equipment was provided until the difficulties had arrived at too great a height for them to be of the use expected." Bennett had recommended: "A couple of 12-pounder 4 3/5 inch brass howitzers to break down the palisades, and with a few carcases to set fire to the huts and interior fencing already described, places the strongest pah at the mercy of a few men; but without these means, I conceive that the attack of a strong pah must always be attended with considerable loss to the assailants." At some point, it had been suggested to Despard that a breach might be effected by powder bags; Lieutenant George Phillpotts, RN, volunteering to carry out the hazardous task, was snubbed.

Commander George Johnson, RN, had a 32-pounder gun hauled up by bullocks from HMS Hazard in a day. Whilst Despard supervised the installation of the gun in the early morning of 1 July, covered by a 6-pounder mounted atop Waka's hill, Hōne Heke made a surprise attack on the hill, carrying off the 6-pounder gun along with the flag and flagstaff.

That day, after the 32-pounder had fired the last of its 26 shots, and with Heke's morning attack still fresh in mind, Despard put his opinion to council that the palisades had been loosened and an assault may be successful. Marlow didn't think the breach was practicable, with Colonel William Hulme and Captain Johnson, RN, also protesting against Despard's intent. Lieutenant Phillpotts, alone and unarmed, made a reconnaissance of the pā to within pistol-shot of the palisades targeted by the 32-pounder. After warnings from within the pā for him to go away, he sauntered back to British lines to report that an assault was impracticable. Tamati Waaka Nene warned Despard again that an assault was absolutely impossible, but Despard ordered an assault upon the pā to be made at 3:00 pm.

Marlow's advice, and Bennett's earlier assessment, proved correct when the soldiers suffered considerable losses when assailing the pā without success that afternoon. In a despatch to Governor FitzRoy the following day, 2 July, Despard acknowledged the assistance of Marlow and his volunteer pioneers who had laboured under the same inefficiency as the artillery.

==== Chatham pā experiments ====
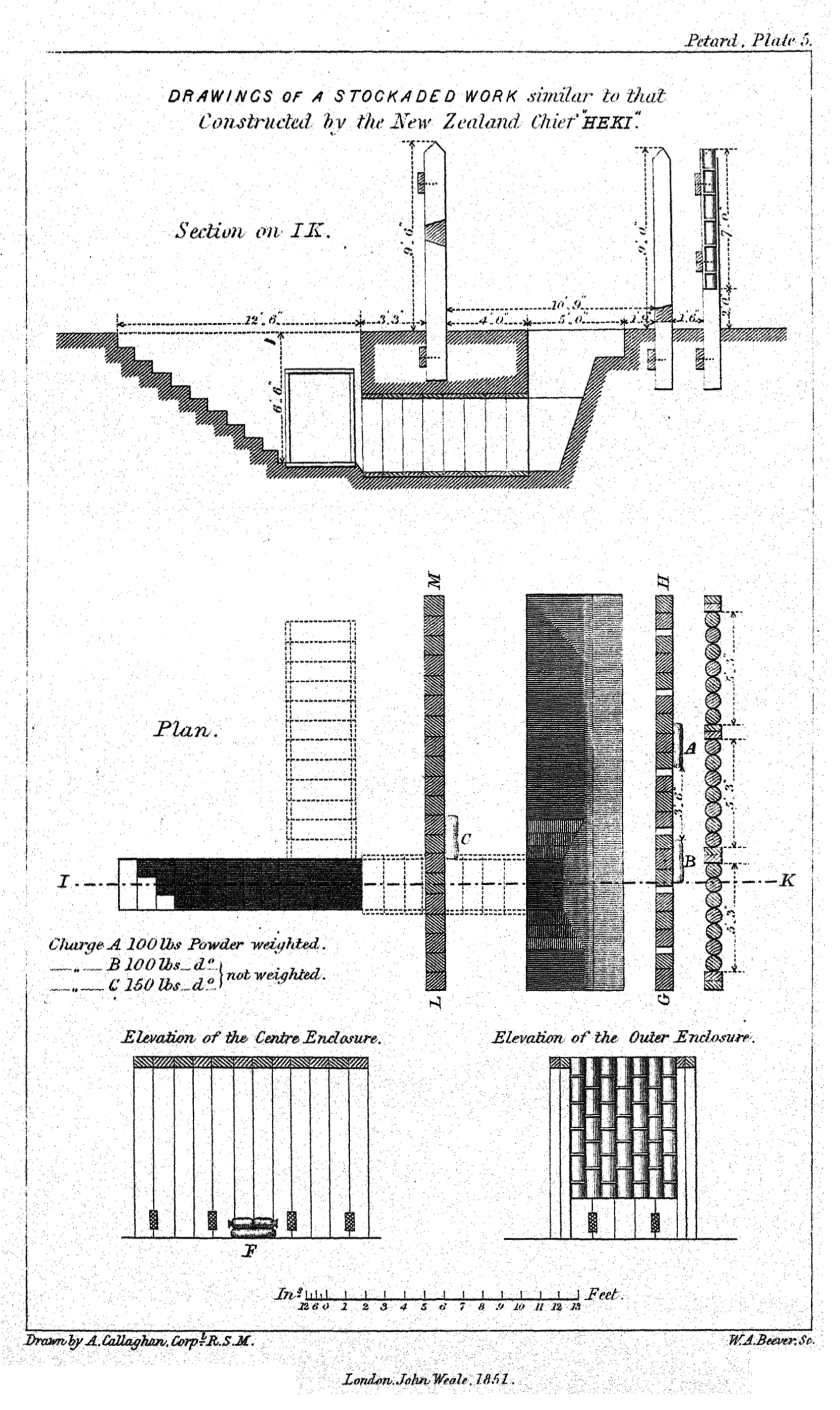
Chatham test stockaded work based on Marlow's drawings of Heke’s pā, 1846

Upon Marlow's drawings and description of Hōne Heke's pā sent to home to England, in August–September 1846, the Royal Engineers erected part of a stockaded work based upon it, to the left of Chatham Lines, so as to establish the best mode of breaching it by bags of gunpowder. The experiments at Chatham were made in October and December producing some practical breaches. In June 1847 the Engineers erected a double stockade for training the newly formed Royal New Zealand Fencible Corps, then about to proceed to New Zealand, in the means of capturing such works.

==== Pakaraka ====
Before daylight on 16 July 1845, with Despard, 200 infantry, two guns and a proper proportion of artillery, with Marlow and his pioneers, marched from Waimate to engage one of Heke's principal chiefs, Te Haratua, and warriors, at his Pakaraka pā, some six miles away. About half a mile short of the pā, the Waitangi River bridge was found cut down and burning, requiring immediate repair. Meanwhile, Despard moved on with a reconnoitering party, only to find the pā had been deserted, its inhabitants having moved off through thick bush adjoining the pā as the troops came into view. Most of the provisions found inside were destroyed or carried away, and Te Haratua's pā was burned to the ground. Following this, winter quarters were taken up at Waimate until weather improved for further field operations and the arrival of reinforcements from overseas.

==== Ruapekapeka ====
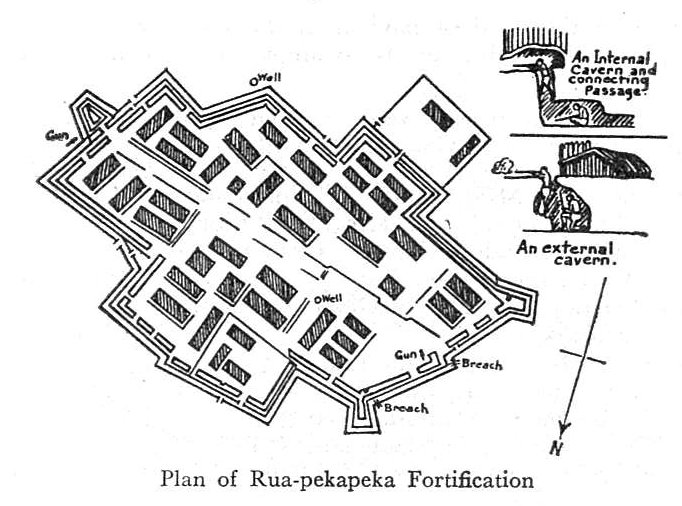
Plan of Ruapekapeka. Drawing: James Cowan, after Marlow, RE, Leeds, RN, and Du Moulin

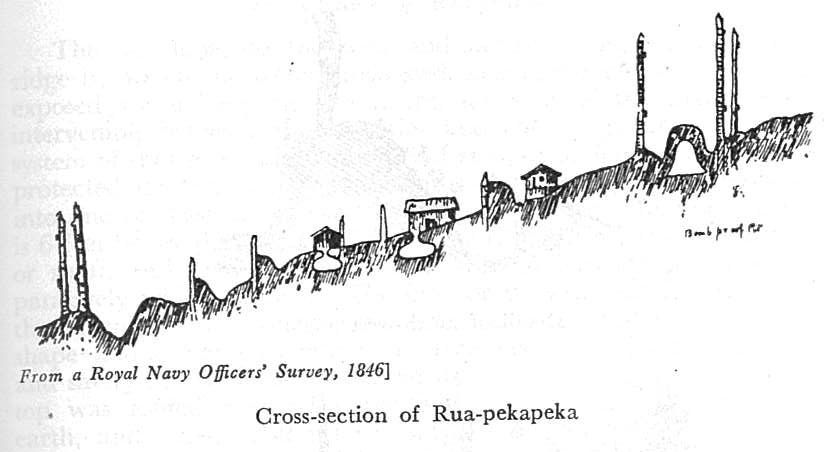
Cross-section of Ruapekapeka

Following Ohaeawai, the troops proceeded to protect themselves in the construction of defensive works at Waimate and later moved the troops to Kororareka. Kawiti constructed a remote strong pā at Ruapekapeka.

In December, the force, reinforced by a detachment of the 99th Regiment, 5-1/2 inch Mann mortars designed for New Zealand terrain, and bullocks, with Governor George Grey in HEICS Elphinstone, HMS Castor, HMS North Star, and HMS Racehorse, Royal Marines, Royal Engineers, Royal Artillery, 58th Regiment, Commissariat, HEIC artillery, and Auckland volunteers—some 1178 officers and men with three 32-pounders, one 18-pounder, two 12-pounder howitzers, one 6-pounder brass gun, four 5-1/2 inch mortars and two rocket tubes—moved up the Waikare inlet to camp at Waikare. Māori allies numbered about 450 men. From 13 December the force slowly worked their way up to Ruapekapeka, until, on 27 December, they were about a mile from the stronghold. Māori allies built themselves a pā at about 1200 yards from Ruapekapeka. The whole force had arrived by 31 December and by 9 January all the guns and ammunition had arrived. Marlow and the volunteer pioneers had constructed stockaded batteries of rough timber between 1 and 10 January: the first in front of the camp, about 650 yards from the pā, for one 32-pounder and one 12-pounder howitzer; second at 300 yards for two 32-pounders and the 5-½ inch mortars; and third at 150 yards for one 18-pounder and one 12-pounder howitzer; all targeted upon the west face of the pā. Some trial shots had been made at 650 yards with guns and 24-pounder rockets. On 10 January the guns opened fire all day and at night, making two small breaches in the outer palisade. The mortar shells were persistent, annoying and deafening. The defenders retired from the pā with nearly all outside behind the pā on the Sunday morning, 11 January.

Tāmati Wāka Nene's brother and his men, realising the pā was quiet, successfully reconnoitred the breach, and supported by some men of the 58th under Captain Denny, pushed their way through. They and their reinforcements, found themselves defending the pā against sharp fire for about three hours as their opponents retired into the forest, and there the battle came to an end.

Despard acknowledged Marlow's exertions in constructing batteries at Ruapekapeka in his despatch of 12 January 1846 to Governor George Grey, and a day later, 13 January, Catherine and three daughters left Sydney on the barque Lloyds for Auckland, New Zealand. Marlow, Lieutenant Leeds, HEICN, and Johann Pieter (John) Du Moulin, Commissariat, surveyed and sketched pā for the record.

The forces having returned to Auckland from 17 to 22 January, and only a week with his family since their arrival on 26 January, on 3–4 February Marlow embarked on Slains Castle for Port Nicholson, Wellington, with Hulme and headquarters, to settle the Hutt valley land question. After a short time he was obliged to return to Auckland leaving want of an Engineer Department there to carry out necessary works. The following months saw the marriages of two daughters—Catherine Victor to Philip Turner, Deputy-Assistant-Commissary-General, on 13 June, and Sophia Sewell to William Plummer, Barrack Master, on 1 September.

This whole costly northern war of mostly inconclusive battles, which started in July 1844, had exhausted. For his efforts, Marlow was awarded rank of brevet major on 7 July 1846 Colonel Henry Despard, Colonel Robert Wynyard, and Captain Graham, RN, were appointed Companions of the Most Honourable Military Order of the Bath; Captain Denny, 58th, Lieutenant Wilmot, RA, also received brevet rank; and Tāmati Wāka Nene received a pension of £100 a year. Collinson remarked in 1853:

If the effect of the campaign did not seem to call for such rewards, when compared with a European battle, certainly the steadiness and cheerfulness with which the troops went through the hardships of it deserved them; for the individual labours and responsibilities were greater than in any civilised campaign, whilst the very best results that could be obtained were inappreciable by the public.

==== Military works ====
The expanding military presence in New Zealand placed Marlow and his clerk of works, George Graham, to correspondingly accommodate their needs: In Auckland, the construction of commissariat store (1845), officers quarters (1846), magazine (1846) and cells for Fort Britomart; a road from Mount Eden quarry; and wooden barrack buildings and extensions, cook house, wash house, privies (1845–), military hospital and out-buildings (1846–47), and enclosing basalt stone wall (1847–50) for Albert Barracks. The wall was constructed by at least 67 Māori he had trained in the art of working stone and making mortar, and whose names he had recorded. The supply of basalt stone from Mount Eden quarry had been secured exclusively for military purposes in September 1846, and there he had some 40 Māori quarrying stone. By December 1847, 104 Māori from 21 tribes worked for Ordnance Department.

In Auckland, the fencible settlements were also designed and laid out, including the construction of 100 ft sheds and out-buildings as temporary barracks, single and double cottages. In expectation of the arrival of the Royal New Zealand Fencible Corps, the Royal Engineers went out to Onehunga to survey and peg out the lower settlement in December 1846, with top and back settlements to follow. Further settlements were established in Howick, Panmure and Otahuhu. The Fencibles arrived in Auckland from 5 August 1847.

Following Lieutenant Collinson's arrival in September 1846, and his assignment to the southern region, the construction of temporary wooden barracks and powder magazine for Mount Cook in Wellington (1846), and stockades and blockhouses (1846–) for Wanganui.

==== Homeward bound ====
Colonel Daniel Bolton, RE, with 13 sappers and miners and the first contingent of fencibles, arrived in Auckland on 5 August 1847, relieving Marlow as Commanding Royal Engineer. Having sold up household items from their Emily Place residence over the following months, on Wednesday, 1 March 1848, Major Marlow, Catherine and youngest daughter Charlotte Augusta, left for the aptly named schooner Cheerful destined for Sydney and England. Upon their departure a group of about 100 Māori employed by the Engineer Department assembled on the beach to show their respect with three hearty cheers and a presentation of highly valued feathers given to men of distinction. Marlow placed the feathers in his hat and amidst their deafening shout, the Marlows embarked.

=== Ireland ===
Returned to England, Marlow was assigned to Ireland as Commanding Royal Engineer, Kilkenny district, from February 1849 to 1853, and Belfast district to March 1854. There on 7 May 1850, daughter Charlotte Augusta married James Baird Burke at St John's Church, Kilkenny. The occasion was soon followed by the death of her mother, Catherine, on 10 June 1850, aged 51 years, and burial at St Canice's Cathedral Graveyard, Kilkenny. Amongst military works, Marlow completed the Gothic revival styled garrison church at Kilkenny Barracks. Soon after promotion to lieutenant colonel on 1 April 1852, granddaughter, Annah Kate Burke, died on 3 October 1852, and was buried with her grandmother at St Canice's Cathedral Graveyard.

=== Jamaica ===
Between April 1854 and May 1857, Marlow served as Commanding Royal Engineer in Jamaica, during which time he advanced to the rank of colonel on 1 April 1855.

== Last years ==
Back in England since arrival on the Orinoco in May 1857, Marlow returned home to Alverstoke to live with his sister and niece at Anglesea Lodge, then to nearby Knapp Green in 1861, retiring from service on full pay in late March 1862, with promotion to honorary rank of major general, on 3 April 1862. He died at Anglesea Lodge on the 4 January 1864, aged 69.

== Legacy ==
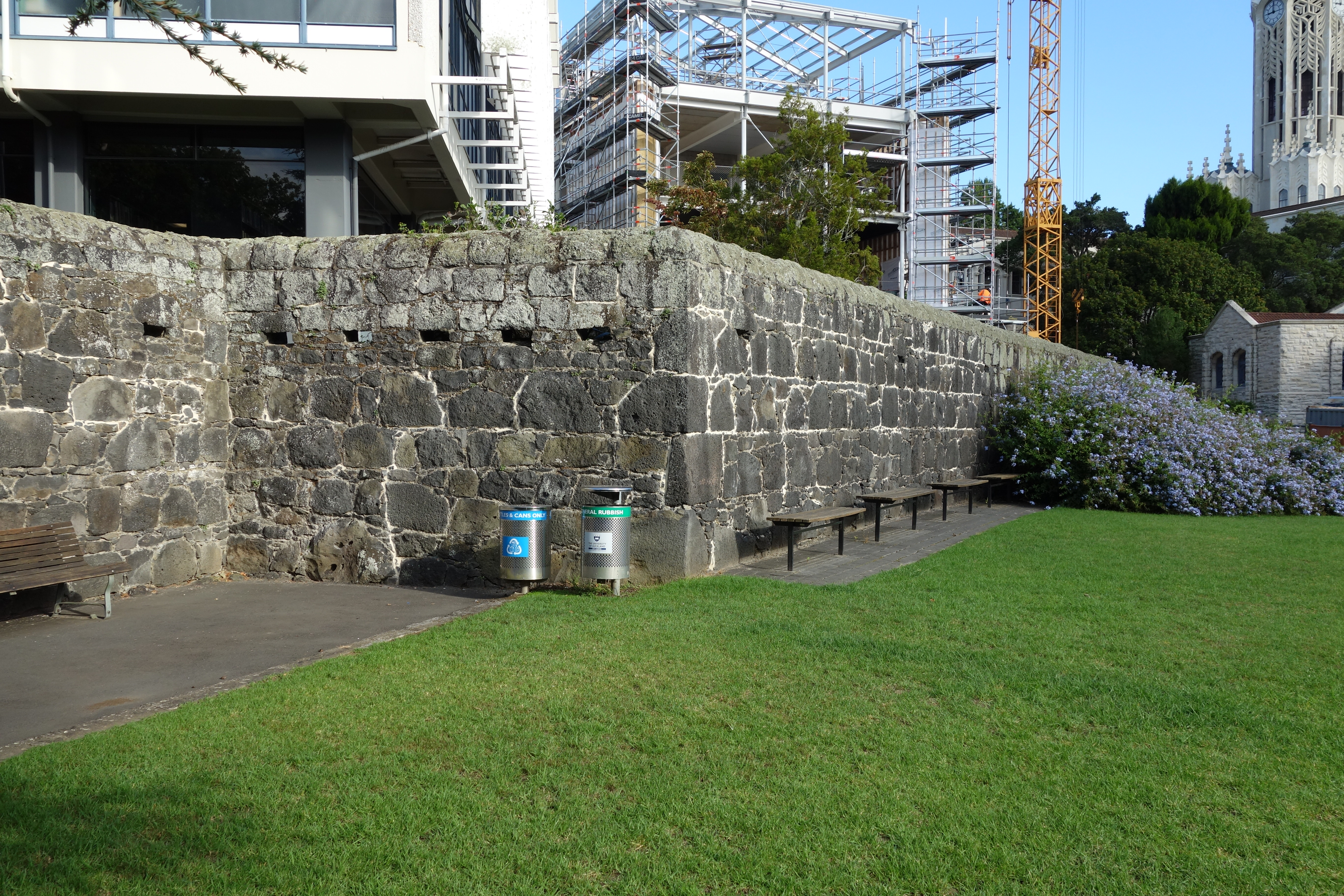
Albert Barracks wall, 2016

Dr Ludwig Leichhardt named the Marlow River after Captain Marlow, RE, who had assisted him in outfitting the expedition. The river is a small stream in the Burke district of Far North Queensland, Australia, which runs to the Gulf of Carpentaria west of Mornington Island. The expedition had collected water there on 29 August 1845.

A portion of the stone loopholed Albert Barracks wall survives, registered as no. 12 on the New Zealand Heritage List / Rārangi Kōrero, in grounds of the University of Auckland's city campus.

A number of original cottages survive in Auckland's fencible settlements, as well as those at Howick Historical Village and a copy in Jellicoe Park, Onehunga.

The garrison church at Kilkenny Barracks survives, registered as no. 12004017 on the National Inventory of Architectural Heritage, Republic of Ireland, converted to a sports hall.

== Maps ==
- Marlow, William Biddlecomb; Romilly, Samuel (25 May 1824). Plan of part of the Government Ground at the Cascades, showing the proposed exchange of Land with Captain Johnson (Map). 50 feet to 1 inch – via Library and Archives Canada.
- Marlow, William Biddlecomb (7 January 1826). Plan showing the position of the old scow wharf, with the road required by the Bridge Company, coloured yellow (Map). Kingston.
- Durnford, Elias Walker; Marlow, William Biddlecomb; Figg, Edward (15 August 1827). Plan of the Mountain Montreal showing the proposed Government Boundary by a red line (Map). Montreal – via Library and Archives Canada.
- Marlow, William Biddlecomb; Romilly, Samuel (17 July 1827). Plan of the Government Ground near the wood yard at Montreal showing the position of the buildings on lots 46, 47, 48, 49, 50. and the proposed situation of the Ordnance Office. St Helen (Map) – via Library and Archives Canada.
- Marlow, William Biddlecomb (15 March 1828). Survey of the basin of Chambly showing Grande Isle formed by the junction of the Little River Montreal with the Richelieu (Map). Montreal – via Library and Archives Canada.
- Marlow, William Biddlecomb (1846). Sketch of Kawiti's Pah at Rua Peka Peka taken by the combined forces under Colonel Despard and Captain Graham, Jany. 11th 1846 (Map) – via Alexander Turnbull Library.
