= John Marlow =

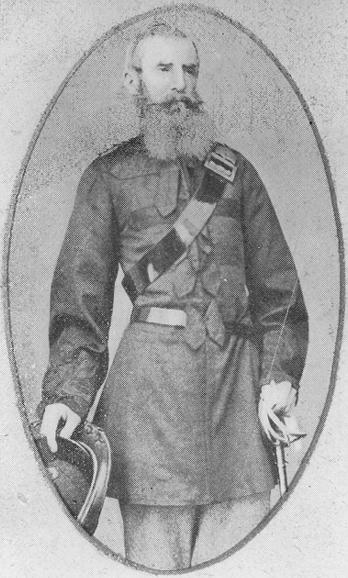
John Marlow of the Native Police

John By Durnford Marlow (10 April 1827 – 27 February 1903) was an officer in the paramilitary Native Police force in the British colony of Queensland. He served in this corps for fourteen years and was stationed at frontier sites such as the Maranoa Region, Port Denison and on the Burdekin River. Marlow, by leading armed escorts of troopers, was also intrinsically involved in the expeditions which led to the establishment of the towns of Cardwell and Townsville.

== Early life ==
John Marlow was born at Montreal, Lower Canada in 1827. His father was William Biddlecomb Marlow, a captain in the Royal Engineers. His grandfather was an admiral in the Royal Navy. After some initial schooling in the Scottish Highlands, Marlow travelled with his family to the colony of New South Wales, where his father's regiment had been posted. At the age of thirteen, he arrived in Sydney on 14 February 1842 on board the Sir Edward Paget. Ludwig Leichhardt was also a passenger on this ship and the Marlows remained close friends with the explorer, Leichhardt later naming a river in their honour. Marlow remained in Australia while his father was sent to serve in the Flagstaff War in New Zealand against the Māori. After this war concluded in 1846, Marlow returned to England with his parents.

== Return to New South Wales ==
While in England, Marlow married Martha Bonser, the daughter of a clergyman and returned with her to New South Wales in the mid 1850s. He took up a position as a manager on a pastoral station at Furracabad station where he became close friends with a future Premier of Queensland in Arthur Palmer.

== Native Police ==
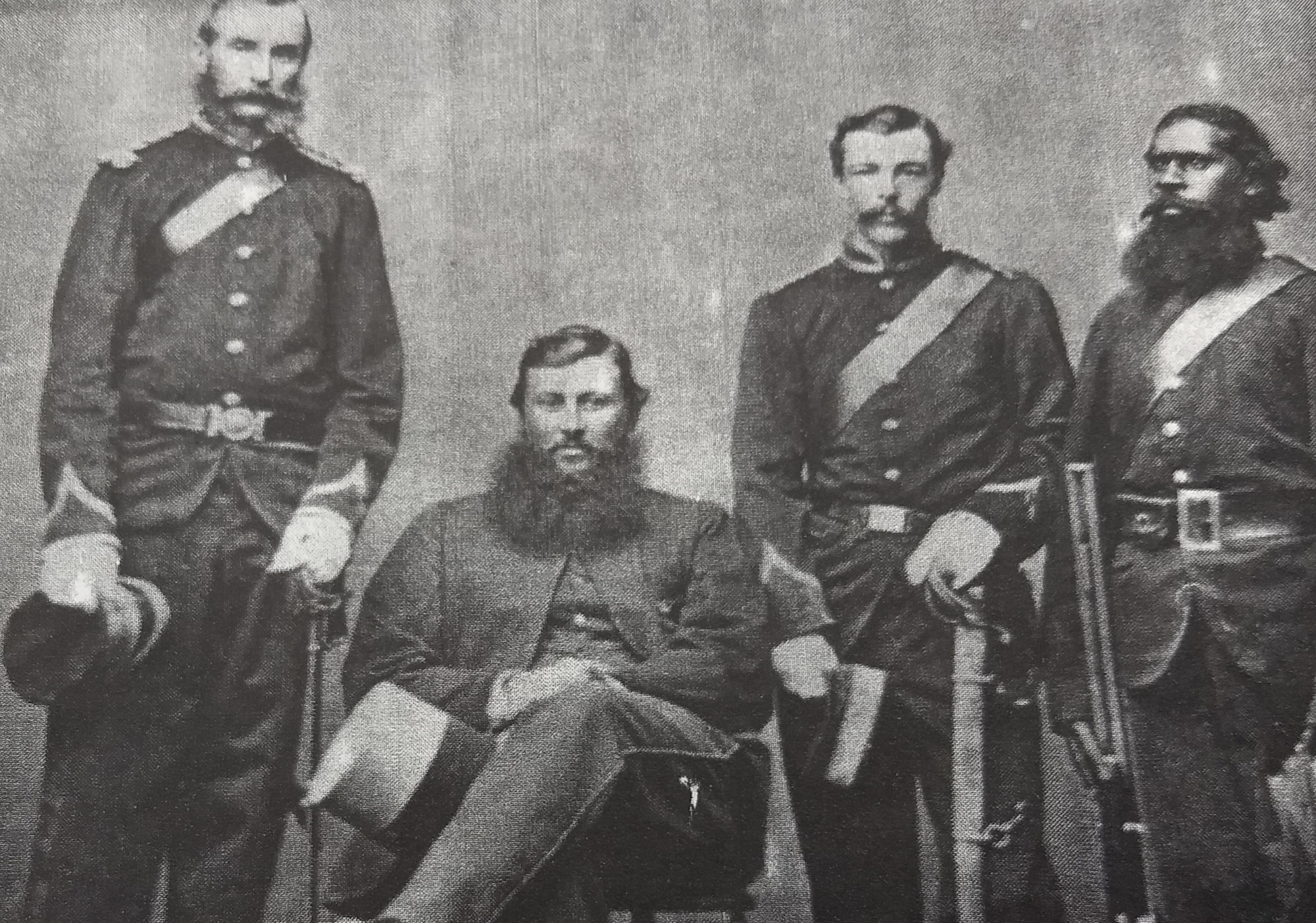
Inspectors John Marlow, G.P.M. Murray and Walter Compigne with Trooper Billy

In 1860, Marlow was appointed to the Native Police as a second lieutenant. The Native Police was a mounted paramilitary force utilised at this time by the Government of Queensland to subdue Aboriginal resistance to British colonisation. The mode of operation of this force was indiscriminate massacre, usually described euphemistically as "dispersal".

=== Maranoa Region operations ===
By 1861, Marlow was promoted to full Lieutenant and was stationed at the Bungil Creek barracks near Roma. He and his troopers were soon ordered to disperse a group of Aboriginals who were spearing stock to the south along the Balonne River near Tootherang pastoral station. Once there, Marlow found a large group from whom he confiscated their spears and utensils, using the group's Aboriginal women to carry them. His troopers later burnt these. The remaining Aboriginal men were joined by another group and left. Marlow decided to follow them up and disperse them. In a month long "warlike operation", Marlow and his troopers tracked the group toward the Warrego River where they made a stand and showed fight, but after a "smart action", they were dispersed.

Later that year, Marlow was ordered to set up a new Native Police barracks on the Maranoa River to the west. This he proceeded to do, and while his troopers were constructing the housing, they were approached by local Aboriginals intent on a corroboree, which was refused. An Aboriginal man then tried to wrestle Marlows rifle from him and then another hit him with a waddy. The troopers then rushed out and fired on the assailants, killing and wounding thirteen people. A message was sent back to the Bungil Creek barracks for assistance.

=== Bowen operations ===
In 1863, Marlow was transferred to Bowen in the Port Denison region of Queensland, where he replaced fellow Native Police officer Walter Powell. Not long after he arrived, his two-year old daughter died of diphtheria. In 1864, Marlow was dispatched, with three troopers under his command to McLellan's station near the Burdekin River after two shepherds were killed, with the aim of clearing the Aboriginal people from the property.

Marlow was commissioned in January 1864 to provide the armed escort for George Elphinstone Dalrymple's expedition to Rockingham Bay to establish a settlement there, which was later named Cardwell. The local Aboriginal people were advised to "clear out" and some were "set upon [...] and rather cut up" by the expeditionary force. In April of the same year, Marlow with Acting Sub-Inspector Kennedy and 8 troopers, provided the armed escort for Andrew Ball's initial expedition to survey the future town of Townsville.

Marlow's detachment was later augmented to twenty troopers which were utilised in scattering a number of Aboriginal people with "hostile demonstrations" near the Inkerman Downs and Jarvisfield pastoral stations under the ownership of Robert Towns. Marlow dispatched sub-Inspectors John Bacey Isley and Ferdinand Macquarie Tompson to the south of Bowen which resulted in dispersals at Strathdon station, Proserpine, Goorganga, Bloomsbury, St Helens and in the mountainous region behind the coastal plains. Marlow's zeal in performing his duties was rewarded by the Government of Queensland with a promotion to a chief-inspector, but he declined the position and stayed with the Native Police detachment at Bowen.

In 1867, Marlow was involved in an extensive search mission of coastal areas for several shipwreck survivors. Reports indicated that the castaways were living with Aboriginals and as a consequence Marlow in conjunction with Inspector John Murray of the native police based at Cardwell conducted searches of every Aboriginal camp they could find between Townsville and Hinchinbrook Island. The mission was unsuccessful in finding the shipwrecked sailors.

=== Dalrymple operations ===
With the opening of the Cape River goldfields in 1868 the authorities decided to move the Native Police barracks from Bowen to the new settlement of Dalrymple about 80 km west of Townsville. Marlow was placed in charge of this new barracks and accompanied by his troopers and Queensland Police Commissioner, David Thompson Seymour, he provided the first Gold Escort from the goldfields to Townsville.

However, with the removal of the barracks from Bowen, Aboriginal attacks in this region re-intensified, exemplified by prominent pastoralist Sidney Yeates having to abandon his sheep station. Both the Police Commissioner and Marlow advised that they were no longer able to provide adequate protection from the Dalrymple base. Marlow suggested collecting all the coastal Aborigines from Port Mackay to Townsville and confining them on an island off the coast where they could be ‘taught to be useful’. The Colonial Secretary was ‘unable to entertain’ Marlow’s proposition. Pastoralists in the Bowen region were unhappy with the lack of protection, with some seeking to embarrass Marlow publicly with complaints of inappropriate interactions between Aboriginal women and his troopers. Further misfortune followed Marlow with an immense flood of the Burdekin River destroying the town of Dalrymple, Marlow's house and the police barracks being washed away.

For the remainder of his placement at Dalrymple, Marlow took on a more administrative role managing the gold escort duties of the native police and investigating cases of murder, missing persons and riotous behaviour on the goldfields. He retired from the native police in 1873.

== Later life ==
From 1874 to 1876, Marlow returned to Bowen as a resident, where his house was damaged during an intense storm. In 1876, he moved to the Brisbane suburb of Kangaroo Point where, in quite a large departure from his previous career, he became chief inspector for the Society for the Prevention of Cruelty to Animals. He remained in this position until 1885, when he became employed as a health inspector. Marlow continued in various posts for the Board of Health until his death in 1903. Mount Marlow at Cape Pallarenda near Townsville is named after him.
