= List of extreme points of New Zealand =

This article lists the extreme points of New Zealand – the places that lie farther north, south, east or west than any other location in New Zealand.

State Highway 1 runs throughout the two main islands from Cape Reinga in the north to Bluff in the south. Cape Reinga is sometimes popularly thought to be the northernmost point of the North Island, but North Cape is further north, with Cape Reinga the northwesternmost point. Similarly, Bluff is sometimes thought to be the southernmost point of the South Island, but Slope Point in the Catlins is slightly further south than the Bluff (the promontory that gives the town its name).

== Extreme points ==
=== New Zealand overall ===
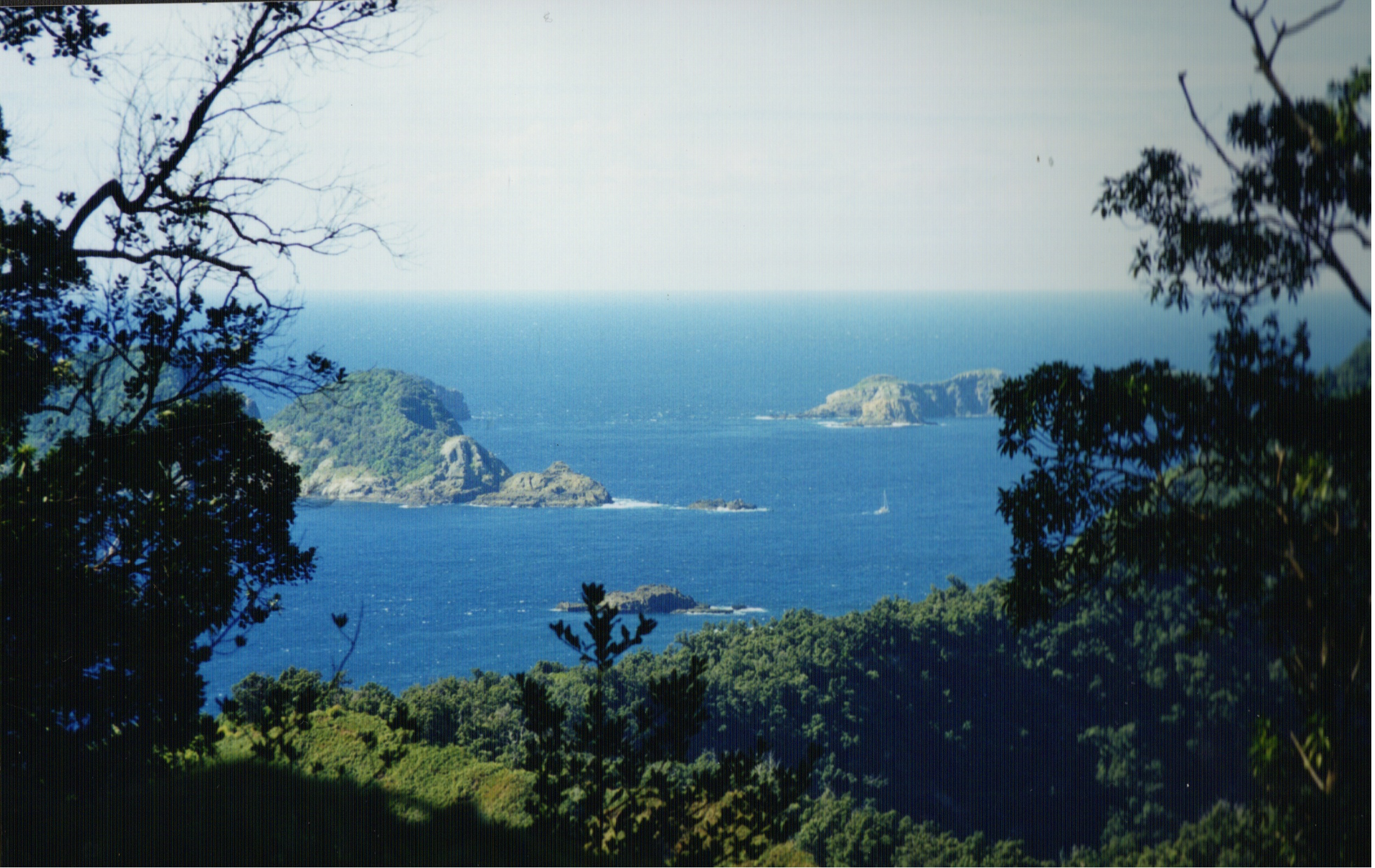
Kermadec Islands (Nugent Island top far left, not visible) – northernmost

The northernmost, southernmost, westernmost, easternmost, highest and lowest points:

- Northernmost point – Nugent Island, in the Kermadec Islands (29°13′54″S 177°52′09″W)
- Southernmost point – Jacquemart Island (off the south coast of Campbell Island) in the Campbell Island group (52°37′10″S 169°07′33″E)
- Westernmost point – Cape Lovitt, Auckland Islands (50°47′59.42″S 165°52′12.46″E)
- Easternmost point – Forty-Fours / Motuhara, in the Chatham Islands, east of Chatham Island (43°57′44″S 175°50′01″W)
- Highest point – Aoraki / Mount Cook, 3,724 m (12,218 ft) above sea level (43°35′42″S 170°8′31″E)
- Lowest point – near Momona, Taieri Plains, 2 m (6 ft 7 in) below sea level (approximately 45°55′S 170°11′E)

New Zealand's farthest inland point, at 45°00′34.0″S 169°22′24.5″E, is some 8 km (5 mi) northeast of the town of Cromwell. It is 119.44 kilometres (74.22 mi) from the Tasman Sea and Pacific Ocean.

The distance from northernmost to southernmost (Nugent Island to Jacquemart Island) is 2,813 kilometres (1,748 mi). The distance around the four points is 6,176 kilometres (3,838 mi).

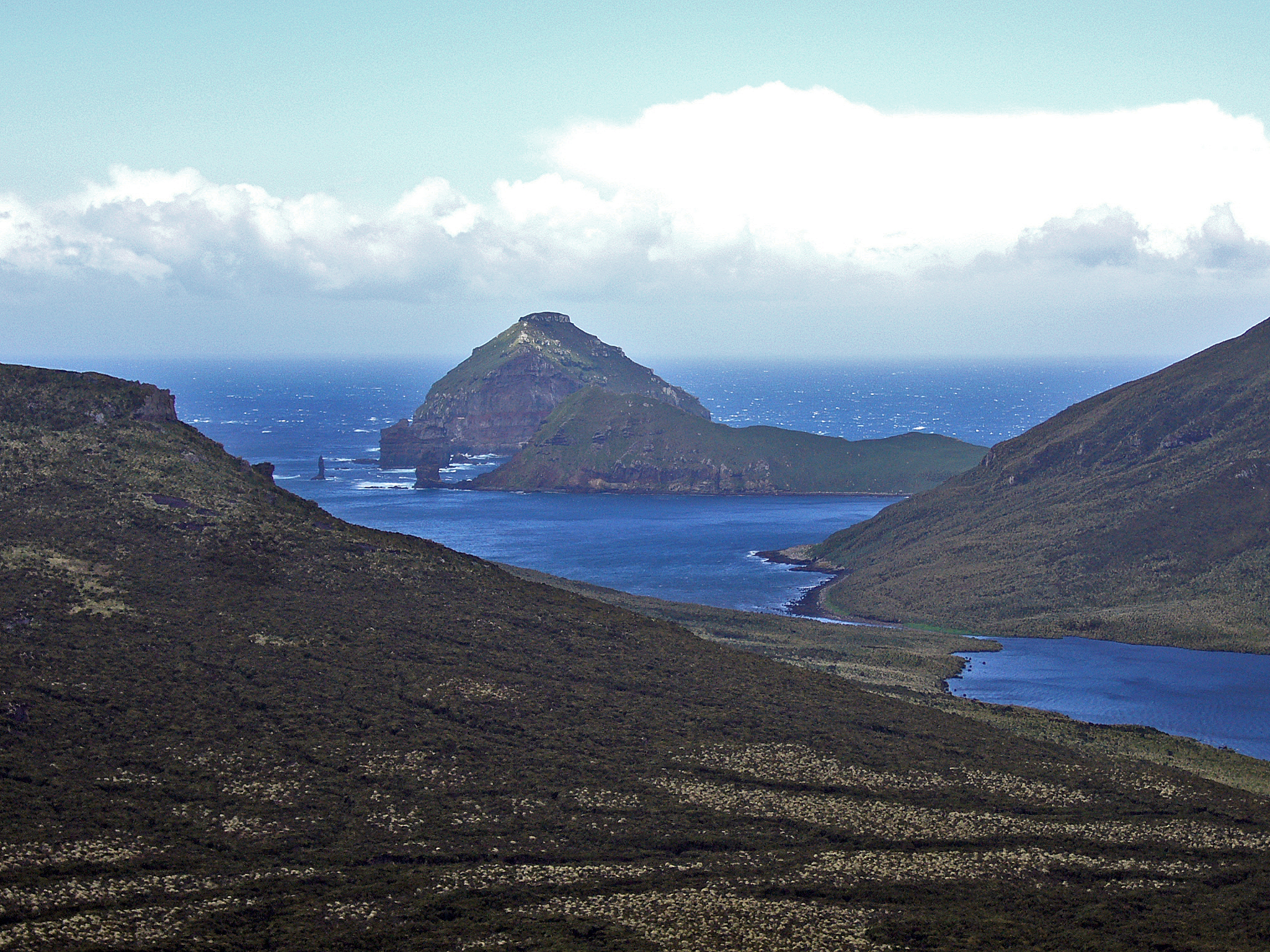
Jacquemart Island in the distance – southernmost

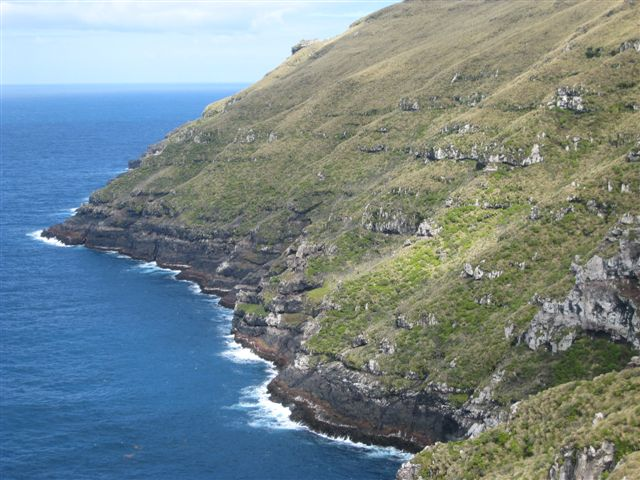
Cape Lovitt – westernmost

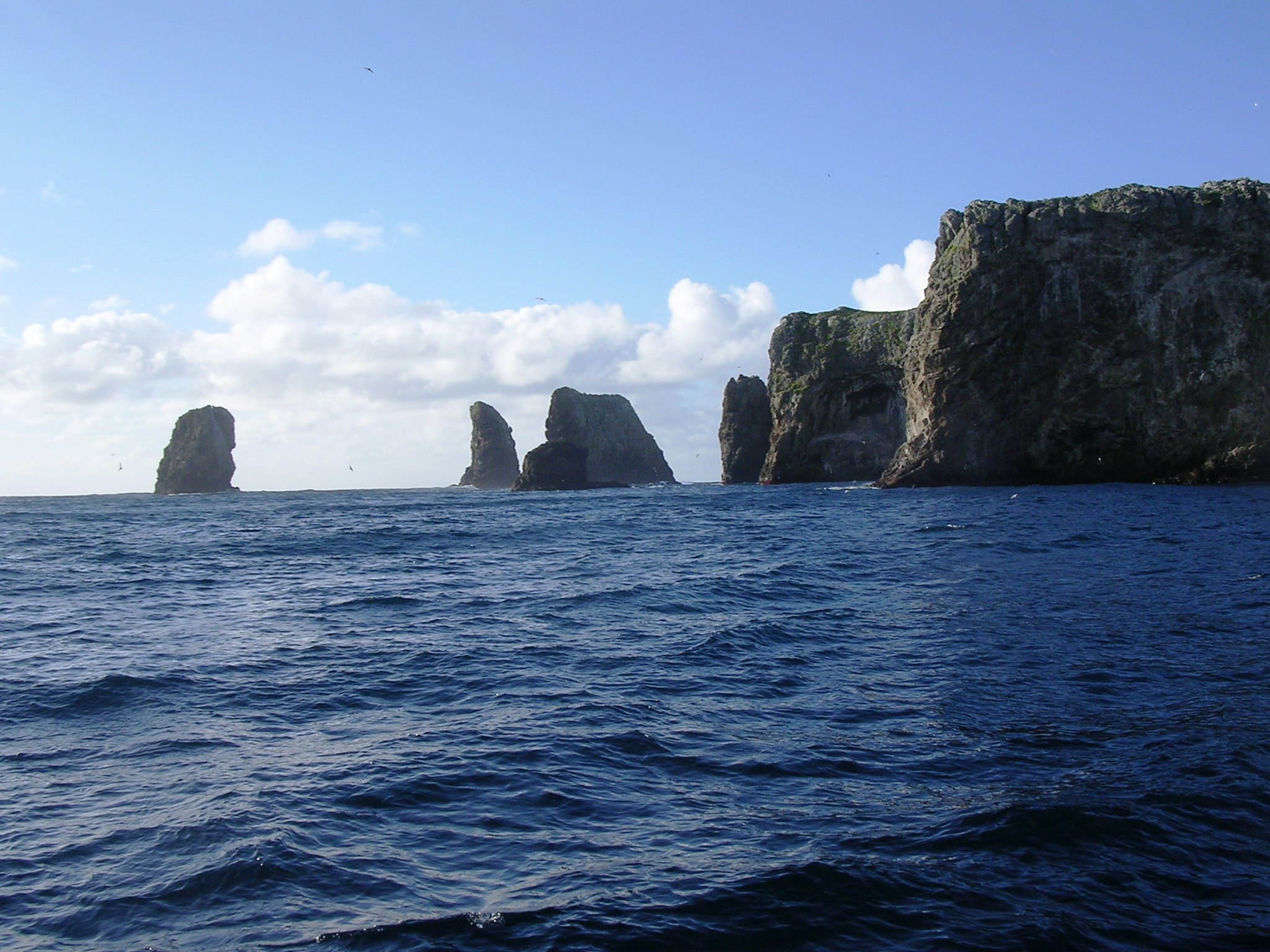
Forty-Fours/Motuhara – easternmost

(This excludes New Zealand's claims over lands in the Ross Dependency, and its administration of the Tokelau Islands.)

=== North Island ===
- Northernmost point – Surville Cliffs, North Cape
- Southernmost point – Cape Palliser
- Westernmost point – Cape Maria van Diemen
- Easternmost point – East Cape
- Highest point – Mount Ruapehu, 2797m above sea level
- Lowest point – Lagoon Farm/Parklands, Napier, 1m below sea level. Lowest man-made point is Martha Mine pit, Waihi, 15m below sea level.

=== South Island ===
- Northernmost point – Cape Farewell
- Southernmost point – Slope Point
- Westernmost point – West Cape
- Easternmost point – West Head
- Highest point – Aoraki / Mount Cook, 3724m above sea level
- Lowest point – Taieri Plains, 2m below sea level

== Centres of population ==
=== Northernmost settlements ===
Te Hāpua in the far north of the North Island is the northernmost settlement, although there is a permanently staffed station on Raoul Island, much further north. Kaitaia is the northernmost urban area with at least 1000 people. New Zealand's northernmost city is Whangārei.

The northernmost settlement in the South Island is Pūponga, close to the foot of Farewell Spit. Tākaka is the northernmost South Island urban area with at least 1000 people, and Nelson is the northernmost South Island city.

=== Southernmost settlements ===
The southernmost settlement in New Zealand is Oban, on Stewart Island, although there is a meteorological station on Campbell Island, though this is no longer permanently staffed since 1995. The southernmost town in New Zealand with a population over 1000 is Bluff. New Zealand's southernmost city is Invercargill - also its westernmost city. While New Zealand has a permanently staffed base at Scott Base in Ross Dependency, this area is not considered part of New Zealand.

The southernmost settlement in the North Island is Ngawi, near Cape Palliser. Wellington is the southernmost North Island urban area with population over 1000 and the North Island's southernmost city.

=== Easternmost settlements ===
The settlement of Waitangi on Chatham Island is New Zealand's easternmost settlement. In New Zealand's main chain, the easternmost settlement of any note is Tikitiki. The town of Ruatoria is New Zealand's easternmost town. New Zealand's easternmost city, and urban area with a population over 1000, is Gisborne.

In the South Island, Ward is the easternmost settlement of significance, Picton is the easternmost town with a population over 1000, and Nelson is the easternmost city.

=== Westernmost settlements ===
Small settlements at the head of Doubtful Sound and at Manapouri Hydro are the westernmost settlements in New Zealand. The westernmost settlement of significance is Manapouri, and the westernmost town with a population over 1000 is Te Anau. New Zealand's westernmost city is Invercargill, which is also its southernmost city.

In the North Island, Te Kao is the westernmost as well as the northernmost settlement of significance, Kaitaia is the westernmost town with a population over 1000, and New Plymouth is the westernmost city.

=== Most remote settlements ===
Waitangi on Chatham Island is New Zealand's most remote settlement of significance, being over 700 km (430 mi) from mainland New Zealand and the nearest other significant settlement.

Twizel (population 1,790) is the country's most remote urban area with a population over 1,000. The nearest town by road is Cromwell (population 7,470), 141 km (88 mi) away.

Christchurch (population 407,800) is the country's most remote city with a population over 30,000. The nearest city by great-circle distance is Nelson (population 50,800), 256 km (159 mi) away; while the nearest city by road distance is Dunedin (population 104,000), 360 km (220 mi) away.

=== Closest point to Australia ===
The closest point to Australia (not including Australian external territories) and Tasmania is near the Resolution Island lighthouse at 45°44'S, 166°27'E (Fiordland), a distance of approximately 1,491 kilometres (926 mi) from a point near Tasman Island lighthouse 43°12'S, 148°E (Tasmania).

The shortest distance from New Zealand territory to Australian territory outside Antarctic claims is from Auckland Island to Macquarie Island – a distance of approximately 617 kilometres (383 mi).

== See also ==
- Geography of New Zealand
- Extreme points of Earth
