= Geography of New Zealand =

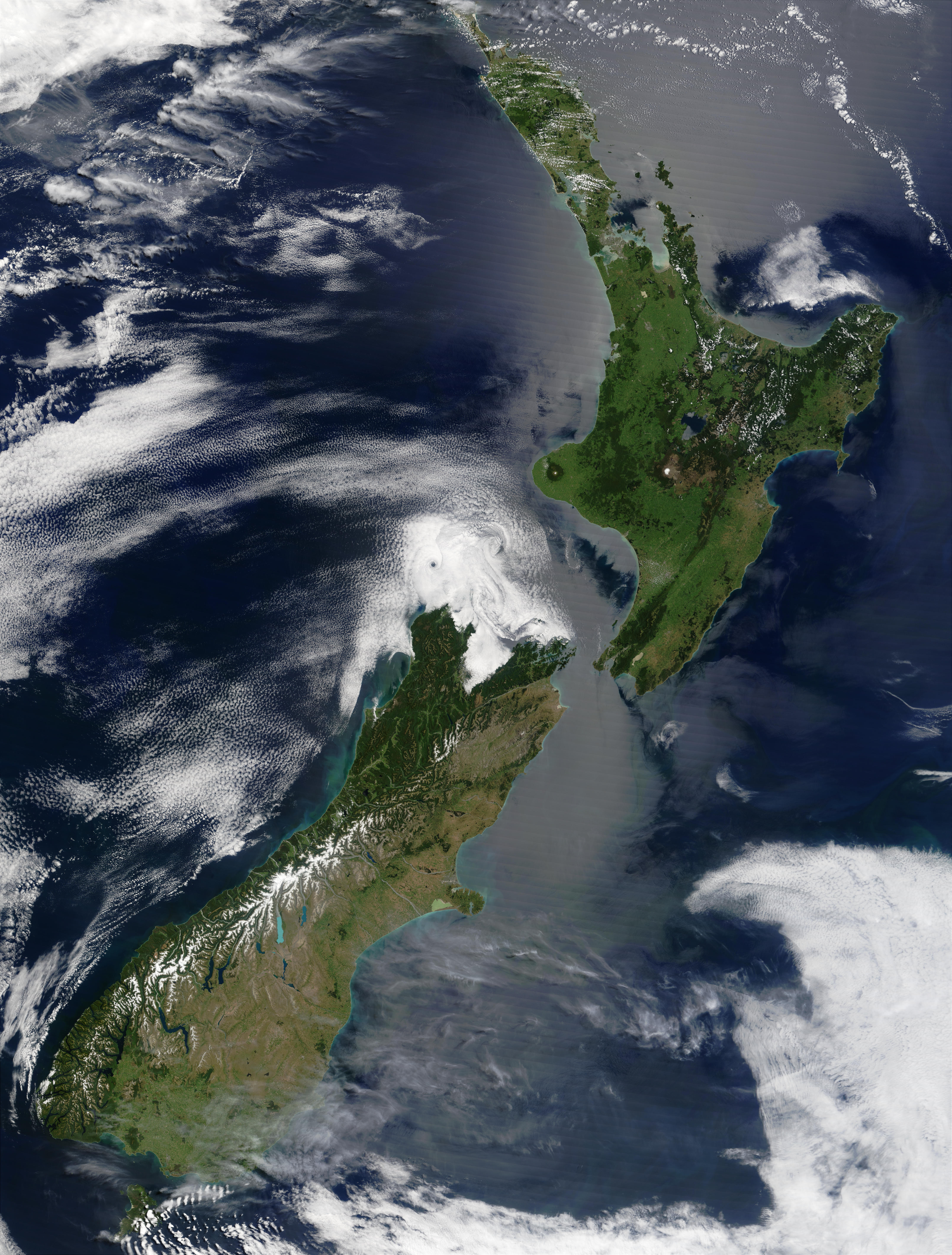
- New Zealand in the South Pacific Ocean
- Region: Oceania
- Coordinates: 42°S 174°E
- Area: Ranked 75th
  - Total: 268,680 km^{2} (103,740 sq mi)
  - Land: 97.9%
  - Water: 2.1%
- Coastline: 15,134 km (9,404 mi)
- Borders: 0 km
- Highest point: Aoraki / Mount Cook; 3,724 m (12,218 ft)
- Lowest point: Taieri Plain −2 m
- Longest river: Waikato River; 425 km (264 mi)
- Largest lake: Lake Taupō; 3,487 km^{2} (1,346 sq mi)
- Climate: Mostly temperate, with some areas being tundra and subantarctic
- Terrain: Mostly mountainous or steep hills, volcanic peaks in the central North Island, and fiords in the far south west.
- Natural resources: Natural gas, iron, sand, coal, timber, hydropower, gold, limestone
- Natural hazards: Floods, earthquakes, volcanic activity, tsunamis, cyclones, droughts, landslides
- Exclusive economic zone: 4,083,744 km^{2} (1,576,742 mi^{2})

New Zealand (Māori: Aotearoa) is an island country located in the southwestern Pacific Ocean, near the centre of the water hemisphere. It consists of a large number of islands, estimated around 700, mainly remnants of a larger landmass now beneath the sea. The land masses by size are the South Island (Te Waipounamu) and the North Island (Te Ika-a-Māui), separated by the Cook Strait. The third-largest is Stewart Island (Rakiura), located 30 kilometres (19 miles) off the tip of the South Island across Foveaux Strait. Other islands are significantly smaller in area. The three largest islands stretch 1,600 kilometres (990 miles) across latitudes 35° to 47° south. New Zealand is the sixth-largest island country in the world, with a land size of 268,680 km^{2} (103,740 sq mi).

New Zealand's landscapes range from the fiord-like sounds of the southwest to the sandy beaches of the subtropical Far North. The South Island is dominated by the Southern Alps while a volcanic plateau covers much of the central North Island. Temperatures commonly fall below 0 °C (32 °F) and rise above 30 °C (86 °F) then conditions vary from wet and cold on the South Island's west coast to dry and continental a short distance away across the mountains and to the temperate oceanic climate in coastal Southland.

About two-thirds of the land is economically useful, with the remainder being mountainous. The North Island is the most populous island in New Zealand with over 4 million residents and South Island is the second-most populated home to over 1.2 million residents.

New Zealand is situated on the boundary of the Pacific and Australian tectonic plates, making it one of the most active earthquake and volcanic regions in the world. The country has experienced several devastating earthquakes throughout its history.

The New Zealand mainland is about 2,000 kilometres (1,200 miles) east of the Australian mainland across the Tasman Sea, the closest foreign neighbour to its main islands being Norfolk Island (Australia) about 750 kilometres (470 miles) to the north west. Other island groups to the north are New Caledonia, Tonga and Fiji. It is the southernmost nation in Oceania. The relative close proximity of New Zealand to Antarctica has made the South Island a major gateway for scientific expeditions to the continent.

== Physical geography ==
=== Overview ===
An annotated relief map

New Zealand is located in the South Pacific Ocean at 41°S 174°E, near the centre of the water hemisphere. It is a long and narrow country, extending 1,600 kilometres (990 mi) along its north-north-east axis with a maximum width of 400 kilometres (250 mi). The land size of 268,680 km^{2} (103,740 sq mi) makes it the sixth-largest island country. New Zealand consists of a large number of islands, estimated around 600. The islands give it 15,134 km (9,404 mi) of coastline and extensive marine resources. New Zealand claims the ninth largest exclusive economic zone in the world, covering 4,083,744 km^{2} (1,576,742 mi^{2}), more than 15 times its land area.

The South Island is the largest land mass of New Zealand, and is the 12th-largest island in the world. The island is divided along its length by the Southern Alps. The east side of the island has the Canterbury Plains while the West Coast is famous for its rough coastlines, high rainfall, very high proportion of native bush (forest), and glaciers.

The North Island is the second-largest island, and the 14th-largest in the world. It is separated from the South Island by the Cook Strait, with the shortest distance being 23 kilometres (14 mi). The North Island is less mountainous than the South Island, although a series of narrow mountain ranges form a roughly north-east belt that rises up to 1,700 metres (5,600 ft). Much of the surviving forest is located in this belt, and in other mountain areas and rolling hills. The North Island has many isolated volcanic peaks.

Besides the North and South Islands, the five largest inhabited islands are Stewart Island (30 kilometres (19 mi) due south of the South Island), Chatham Island (Wharekauri in Māori or Rēkohu in Moriori) (some 800 kilometres (500 mi) east of the South Island), Great Barrier Island (in the Hauraki Gulf), Rangitoto ki te Tonga / D'Urville Island (in the Marlborough Sounds) and Waiheke Island (about 22 km (14 mi) from central Auckland).

==== Extreme points ====
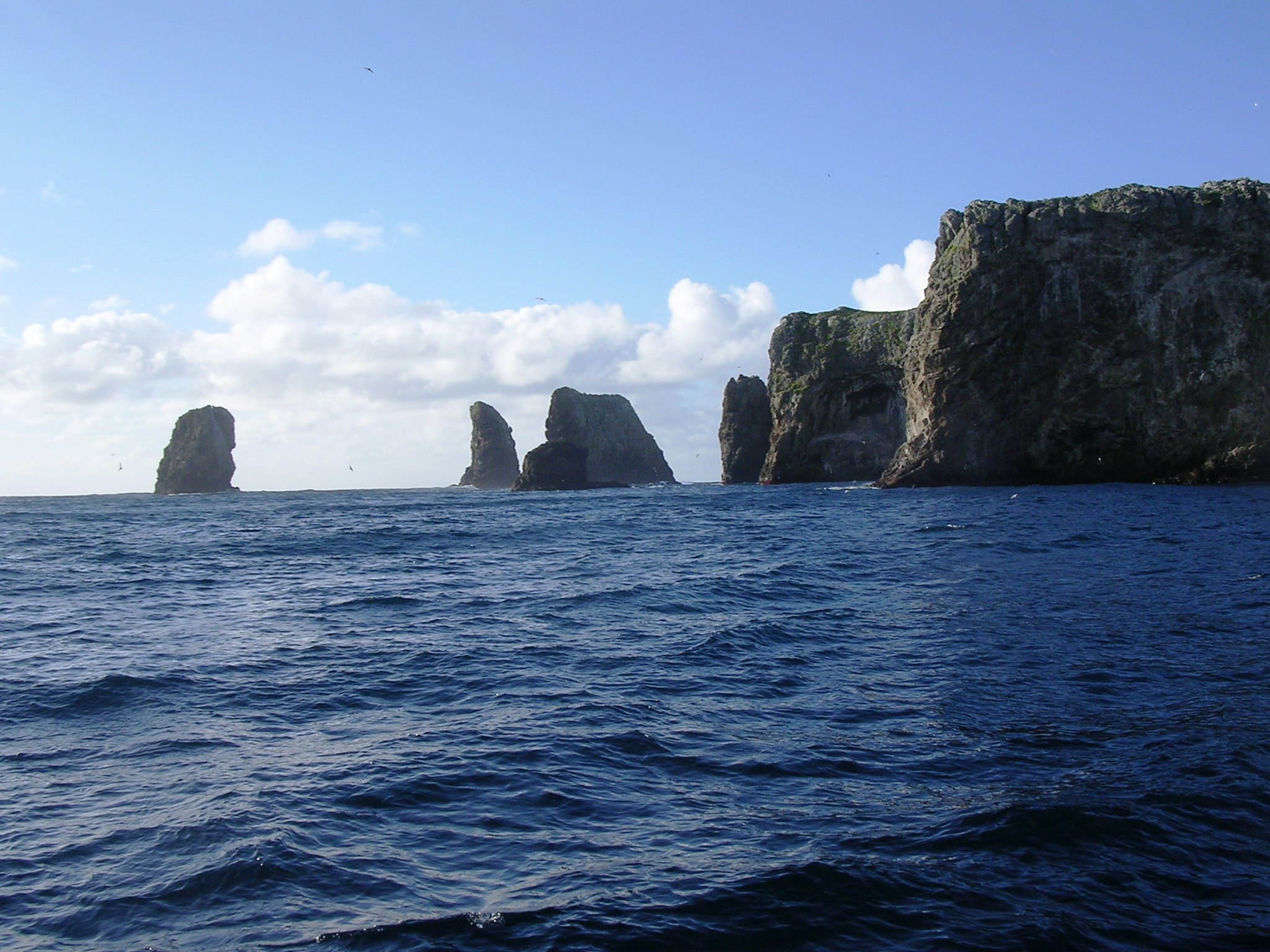
The Forty-Fours viewed from the north; the leftmost islet is the easternmost point of New Zealand.

The phrase "From Cape Reinga to The Bluff" is frequently used within New Zealand to refer to the extent of the whole country. Cape Reinga / Te Rerenga Wairua is the northwesternmost tip of the Aupōuri Peninsula, at the northern end of the North Island. Bluff is Invercargill's port, located near the southern tip of the South Island, below the 46th parallel south. However, the extreme points of New Zealand are in fact located in several outlying islands.

The points that are farther north, south, east or west than any other location in New Zealand are as follows:

- The northernmost point is in Nugent Island in the Kermadec Islands (29.231667°S 177.869167°W).
- The southernmost point is Jacquemart Island in the Campbell Island group (52.619444°S 169.125833°E).
- The easternmost point is situated in a group of islands within the Chatham Islands called the Forty-Fours (43.963306°S 175.831410°W).
- The westernmost point is Cape Lovitt on Auckland Island (50.799838°S 165.870128°E).

==== Antipodes ====
New Zealand is antipodal to points of the North Atlantic, the Iberian Peninsula and Morocco.

New Zealand is largely antipodal to the Iberian Peninsula of Europe. The northern half of the South Island corresponds to Galicia and northern Portugal. Most of the North Island corresponds to central and southern Spain, from Valladolid (opposite the southern point of the North Island, Cape Palliser), through Madrid and Toledo to Cordoba (directly antipodal to Hamilton), Lorca (opposite East Cape), Málaga (Cape Colville), and Gibraltar. Parts of the Northland Peninsula oppose Morocco, with Whangārei nearly coincident with Tangiers. The antipodes of the Chatham Islands lie in France, just north of the city of Montpellier. The Antipodes Islands were named for their supposed antipodal position to Britain; although they are the closest land to the true antipodes of Britain, their location 49°41′S 178°48′E is directly antipodal to a point a few kilometres to the east of Cherbourg on the north coast of France.

In Europe the term "Antipodes" is often used to refer to New Zealand and Australia (and sometimes other South Pacific areas), and "Antipodeans" to their inhabitants.

=== Geology ===
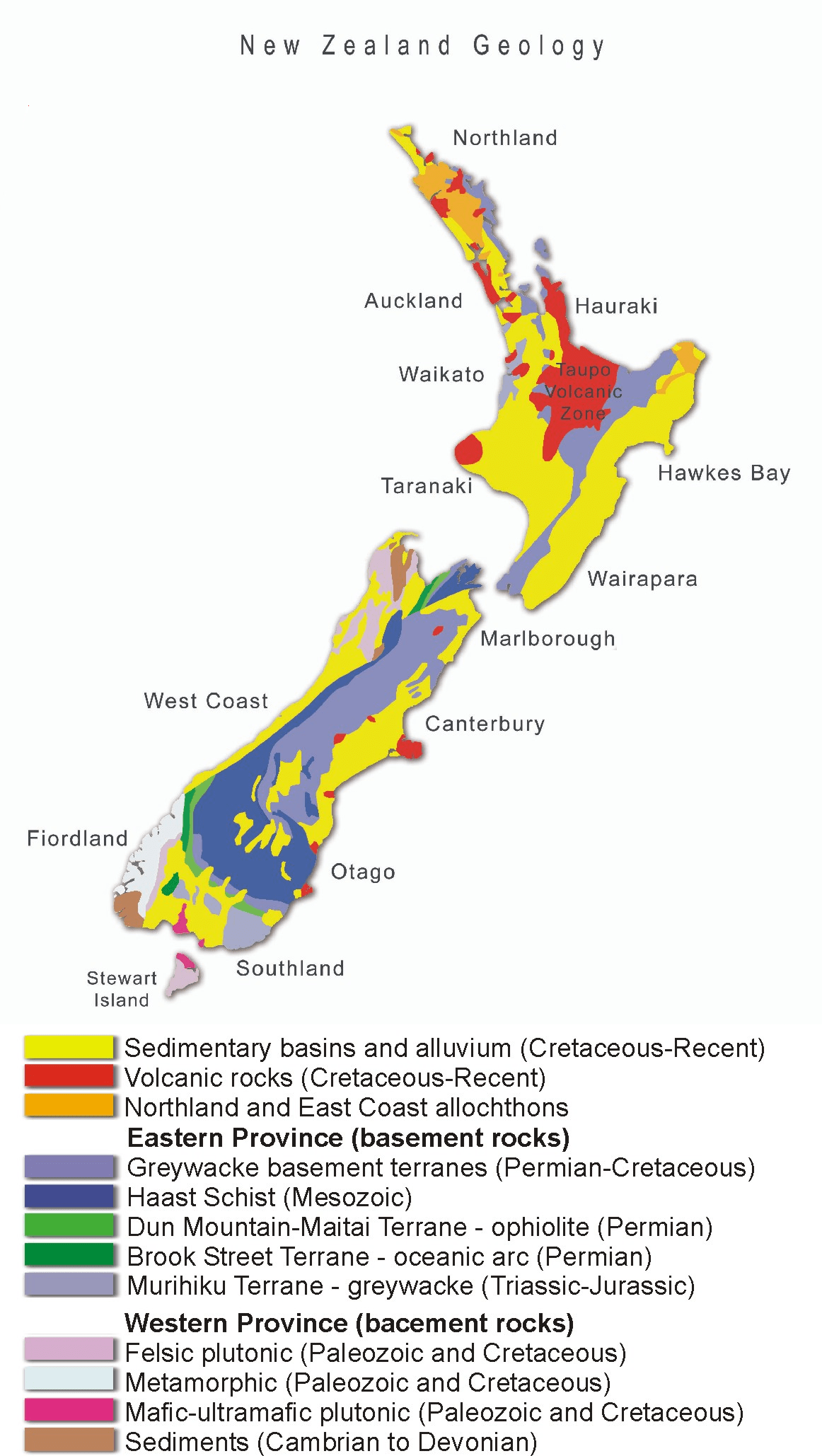

Topography of Zealandia, the submerged continent, and the two tectonic plates

New Zealand is part of Zealandia, a microcontinent nearly half the size of Australia that gradually submerged after breaking away from the Gondwana supercontinent. Zealandia extends a significant distance east into the Pacific Ocean and south towards Antarctica. It also extends towards Australia in the north-west. This submerged continent is dotted with topographic highs that sometimes form islands. Some of these, such as the main islands (North and South), Stewart Island, New Caledonia, and the Chatham Islands, are settled. Other smaller islands are eco-sanctuaries with carefully controlled access.

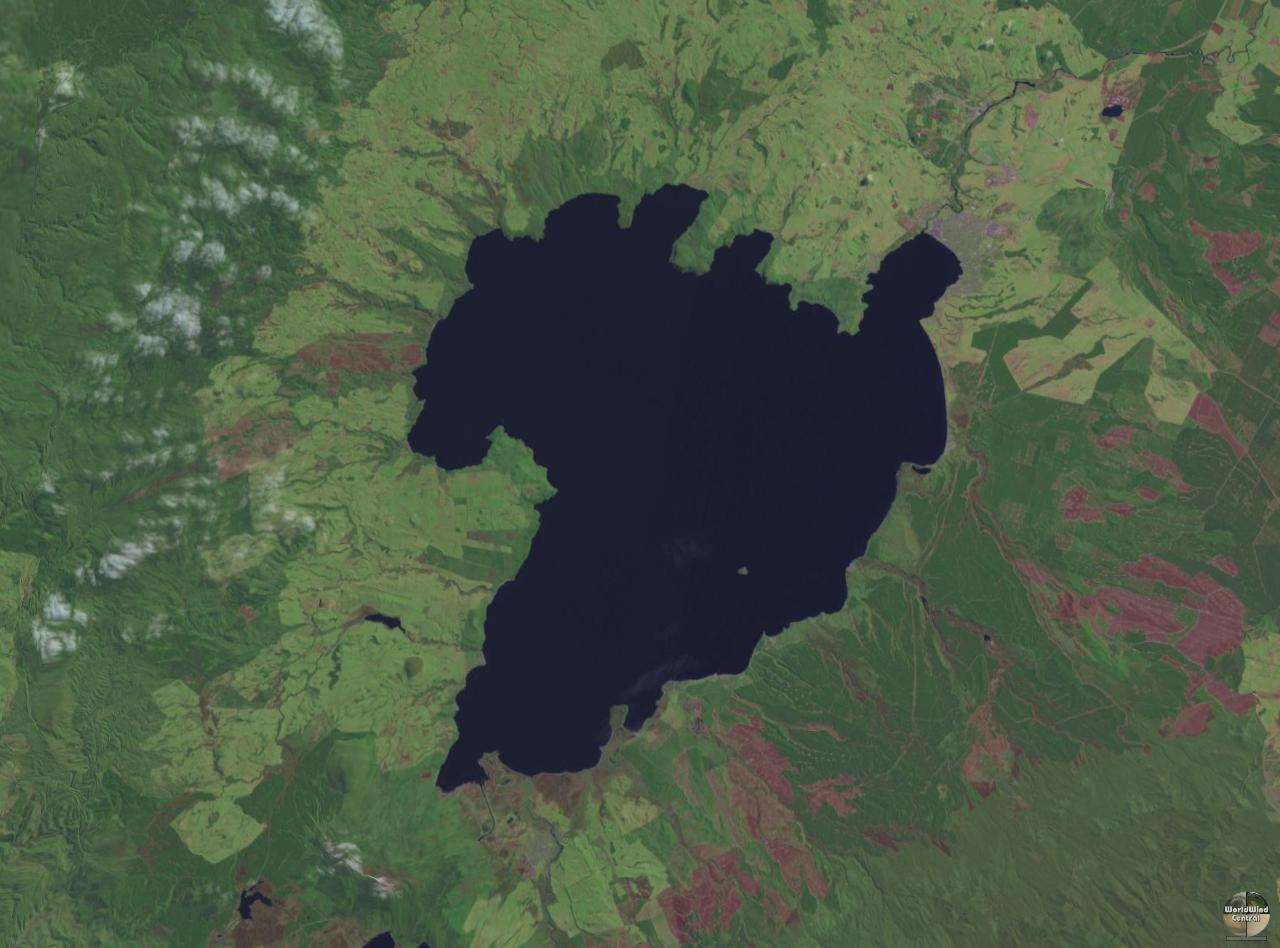
The scalloped bays indenting Lake Taupō's northern and western coasts are typical of large volcanic caldera margins. The caldera they surround was formed during the huge Oruanui eruption.

The New Zealand land mass has been uplifted due to transpressional tectonics between the Indo-Australian plate and Pacific plates (these two plates are grinding together with one riding up and over the other). This is the cause of New Zealand's numerous earthquakes. To the east of the North Island the Pacific plate is forced under the Indo-Australian plate. The North Island of New Zealand has widespread back-arc volcanism as a result of this subduction. There are many large volcanoes with relatively frequent eruptions. There are also several very large calderas, with the most obvious forming Lake Taupō. Taupō has a history of incredibly powerful eruptions, with the Oruanui eruption approx. 26,500 years ago ejecting 1,170 cubic kilometres (280 cubic miles) of material and causing the downward collapse of several hundred square kilometres to form the lake. The most recent eruption occurred c. 180 CE and ejected at least 100 cubic kilometres (24 cubic miles) of material, and has been correlated with red skies seen at the time in Rome and China. The associated geothermal energy from this volcanic area is used in numerous hydrothermal power plants. Some volcanic places are also famous tourist destinations, such as the Rotorua geysers.

The subduction direction is reversed through the South Island, with the Indo-Australian plate forced under the Pacific plate. The transition between these two different styles of continental collision occurs through the top of the South Island. This area has significant uplift and many active faults; large earthquakes are frequent occurrences here. The most powerful in recent history, the M8.3 Wairarapa earthquake, occurred in 1855. This earthquake generated more than 6 metres (20 ft) of vertical uplift in places, and caused a localised tsunami. Fortunately casualties were low due to the sparse settlement of the region. In 2013, the area was rattled by the M6.5 Seddon earthquake, but this caused little damage and no injuries. New Zealand's capital city, Wellington is situated in the centre of this region.

The subduction of the Indo-Australian plate drives rapid uplift in the centre of the South Island (approx. 10 millimetres (0.39 in) per year). This uplift forms the Southern Alps. These roughly divide the island, with a narrow wet strip to the west and wide and dry plains to the east. The resulting orographic rainfall enables the hydroelectric generation of most of the electricity in New Zealand. A significant amount of the movement between the two plates is accommodated by lateral sliding of the Indo-Australian plate north relative to the Pacific plate. The plate boundary forms the nearly 800 kilometres (500 mi) long Alpine Fault. This fault has an estimated rupture reoccurrence interval of ~330 years, and last ruptured in 1717 along 400 kilometres (250 mi) of its length. It passes directly under many settlements on the West Coast of the South Island and shaking from a rupture would likely affect many cities and towns throughout the country.

The rapid uplift and high erosion rates within the Southern Alps combine to expose high grade greenschist to amphibolite facies rocks, including the gemstone pounamu. Geologists visiting the West Coast can easily access high-grade metamorphic rocks and mylonites associated with the Alpine Fault, and in certain places can stand astride the fault trace of an active plate boundary. The South Island also has two major goldfields in Otago and the West Coast.

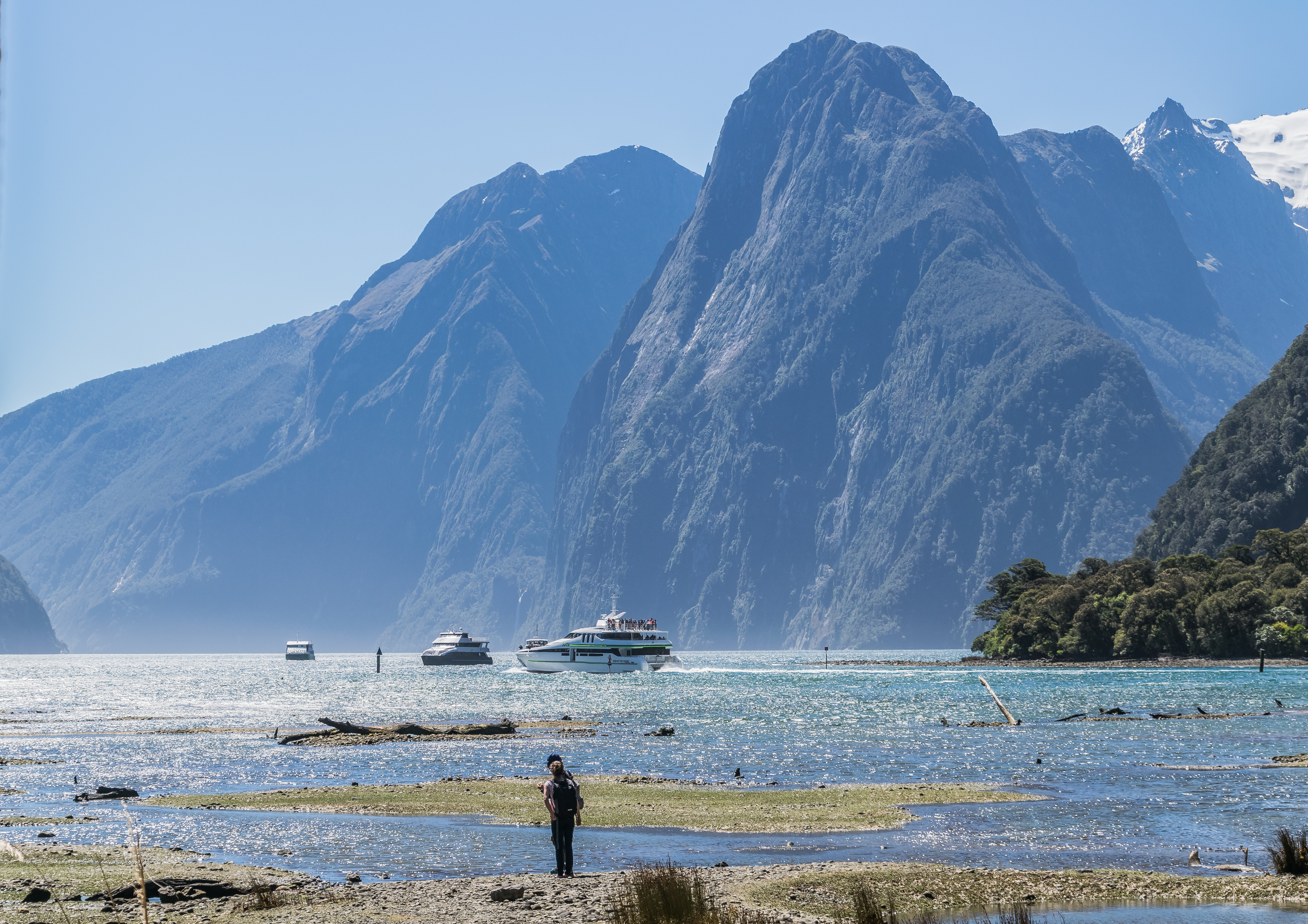
Fiordland is dominated by steep, glacier-carved valleys.

To the south of New Zealand the Indo-Australian plate is subducting under the Pacific plate, and this is beginning to result in back-arc volcanism. The youngest (geologically speaking) volcanism in the South Island occurred in this region, forming the Solander Islands (<2 million years old). This region is dominated by the rugged and relatively untouched Fiordland, an area of flooded glacially carved valleys with little human settlement.

=== Mountains, volcanoes and glaciers ===
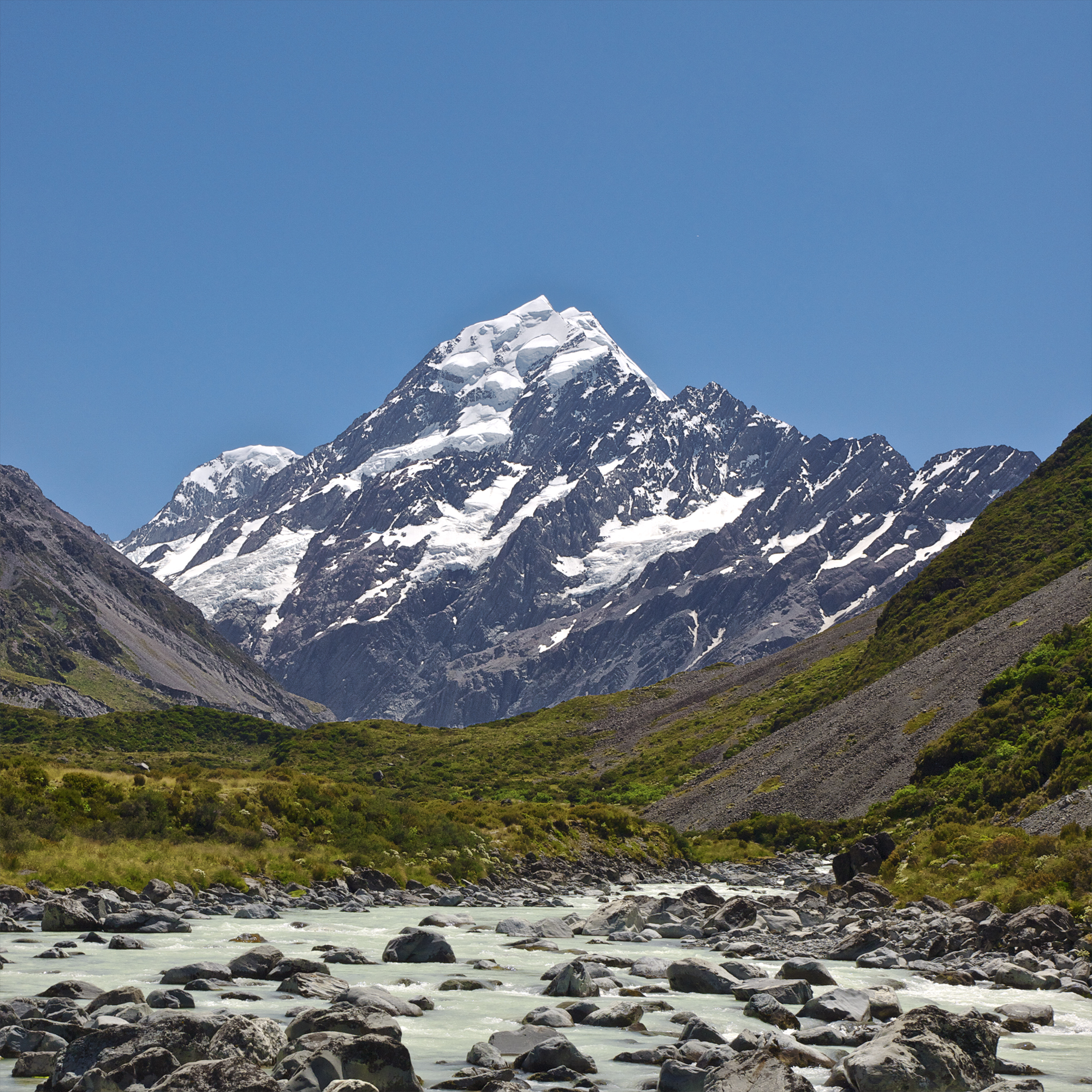
Aoraki / Mount Cook, as seen from Hooker Valley

The South Island is much more mountainous than the North, but shows fewer manifestations of recent volcanic activity. There are 18 peaks of more than 3,000 metres (9,800 feet) in the Southern Alps, which stretch for 500 kilometres (310 mi) down the South Island. The closest mountains surpassing it in elevation are found not in Australia, but in New Guinea and Antarctica. As well as the towering peaks, the Southern Alps include huge glaciers such as Franz Josef and Fox. The country's highest mountain is Aoraki / Mount Cook; its height since 2014 is listed as 3,724 metres (12,218 feet) (down from 3,764 m (12,349 ft) before December 1991, due to a rockslide and subsequent erosion). The second highest peak is Mount Tasman, with a height of 3,497 metres (11,473 ft). The North Island Volcanic Plateau covers much of central North Island with volcanoes, lava plateaus, and crater lakes. The three highest volcanoes are Mount Ruapehu (2,797 metres (9,177 ft)), Mount Taranaki (2,518 metres (8,261 ft)) and Mount Ngauruhoe (2,287 metres (7,503 ft)). Ruapehu's major eruptions have historically been about 50 years apart, in 1895, 1945 and 1995–1996. The 1886 eruption of Mount Tarawera, located near Rotorua, was New Zealand's largest and deadliest eruption in the last 200 years, killing over 100 people. Another long chain of mountains runs through the North Island, from Wellington to East Cape. The ranges include Tararua and Kaimanawa.

The lower mountain slopes are covered in native forest. Above this are shrubs, and then tussock grasses. Alpine tundra consists of cushion plants and herbfields; many of these plants have white and yellow flowers.

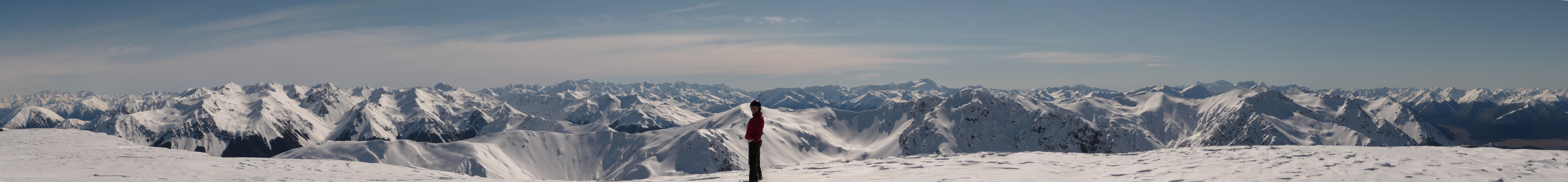
A portion of the Southern Alps mountain chain, as viewed from Hamilton Peak
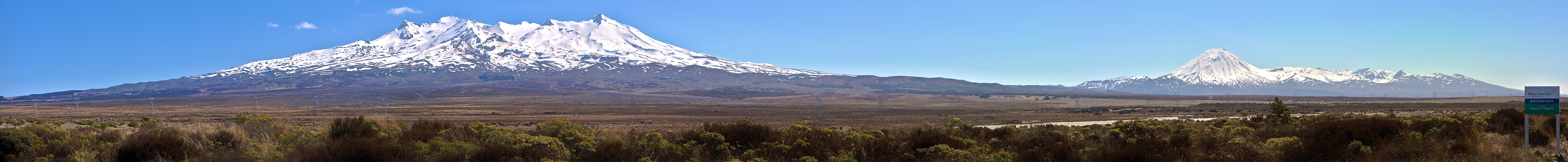
View of the Central Plateau from the Desert Road showing the three active peaks: Snow-capped Ruapehu (left), conical Ngauruhoe (centre) and broad-domed Tongariro (right)

=== Caves ===
New Zealand's cave systems have three main origins, the chemical weathering of limestone by water (karst), lava caves and erosion by waves (sea caves). Therefore, the distribution of limestone, marble (metamorphosed limestone) and volcanoes defines the location of caves in inland New Zealand. The main regions of karst topography are the Waitomo District and Takaka Hill in the Tasman District. Other notable locations are on the West Coast (Punakaiki), Hawke's Bay and Fiordland.

Lava caves (lava tubes) usually form in pāhoehoe lava flows, which are less viscous and typical formed from basalt. When an eruption occurs the outer layer of the lava flow hardens, while the interior remains liquid. The liquid lava flows out as it is insulated by the hardened crust above. These caves are found where there are relatively recent basaltic volcanoes in New Zealand, such as the Auckland volcanic field particularly on Rangitoto, Mount Eden and Matukutūruru.

The distribution of sea caves is more sporadic, with their location and orientation being controlled by weakness in the underlying rock. As cave systems take many thousands of years to develop they can not be isolated from the water that formed them, whether through change in sea level or groundwater flow. If as a cave grows it breaks through to the surface somewhere else it becomes a natural arch, like the Ōpārara Basin Arches near Karamea.

=== Rivers and lakes ===
The proportion of New Zealand's area (excluding estuaries) covered by rivers, lakes and ponds, based on figures from the New Zealand Land Cover Database, is (357526 + 81936) / (26821559 – 92499–26033 – 19216) = 1.6%. If estuarine open water, mangroves, and herbaceous saline vegetation are included, the figure is 2.2%.

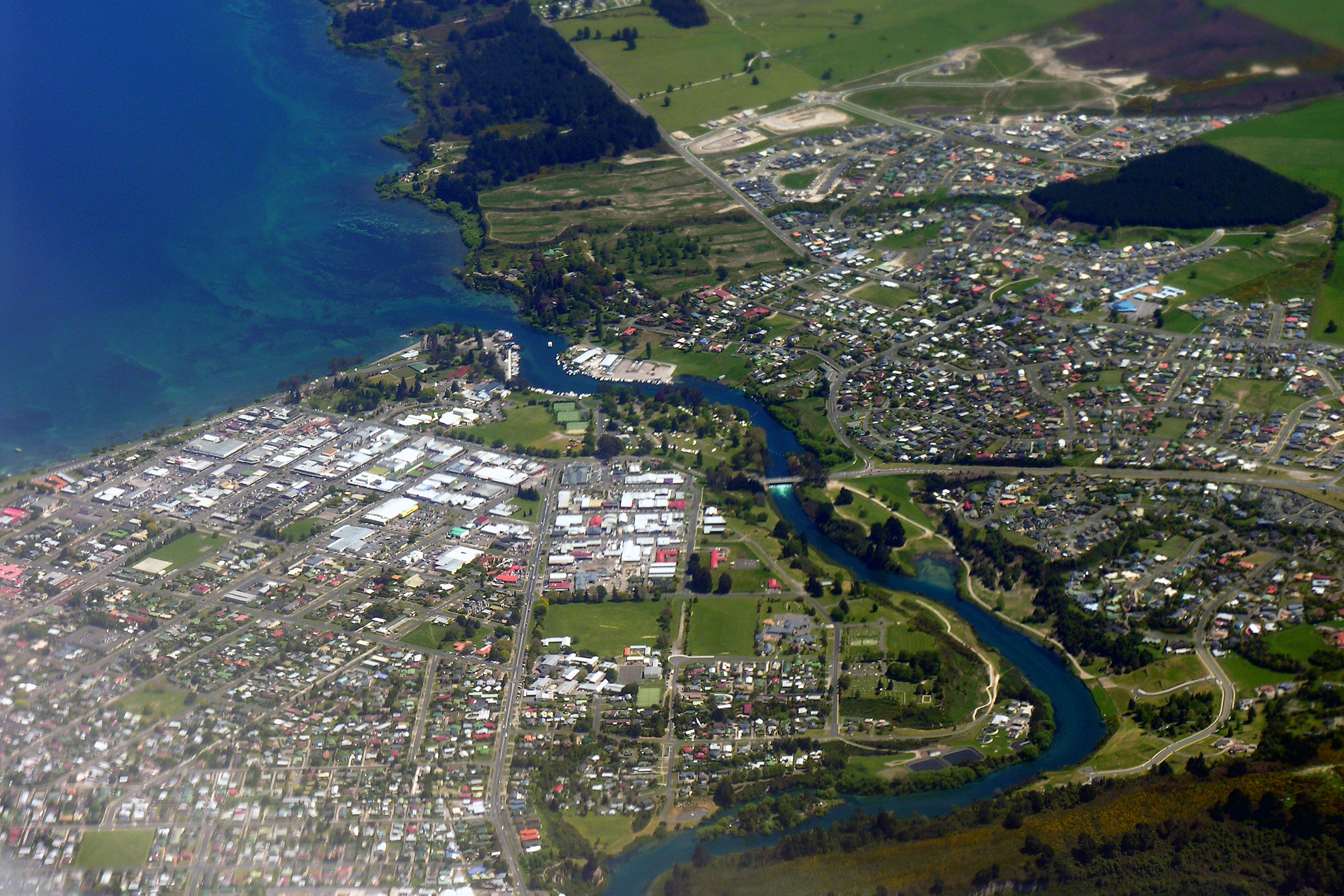
The Waikato River flowing out of Lake Taupō

The mountainous areas of the North Island are cut by many rivers, many of which are swift and unnavigable. The east of the South Island is marked by wide braided rivers, such as the Wairau, Waimakariri and Rangitata; formed from glaciers, they fan out into many strands on gravel plains. The total length of the country's rivers is over 180,000 kilometres (110,000 mi). The Waikato, flowing through the North Island, is the longest, with a length of 425 km (264 mi). New Zealand's rivers feature hundreds of waterfalls; the most visited set of waterfalls are the Huka Falls that drain Lake Taupō. Lake Taupō, located near the centre of the North Island, is the largest lake by surface area in the country. It lies in a caldera created by the Oruanui eruption, the largest eruption in the world in the past 70,000 years. There are 3,820 lakes with a surface area larger than one hectare. Many lakes have been used as reservoirs for hydroelectric projects.

=== Coastal wetlands ===
Wetlands support the greatest concentration of wildlife out of any other habitat. New Zealand has six sites covering almost 551 square kilometres (213 sq mi) that are included in the List of Wetlands of International Importance (Ramsar sites), including the Whangamarino Wetland.

A 2016 global remote sensing analysis suggested that there were 1,191 square kilometres (460 sq mi) of tidal flats in New Zealand, making it the 29th ranked country in terms of tidal flat area.

=== Climate ===
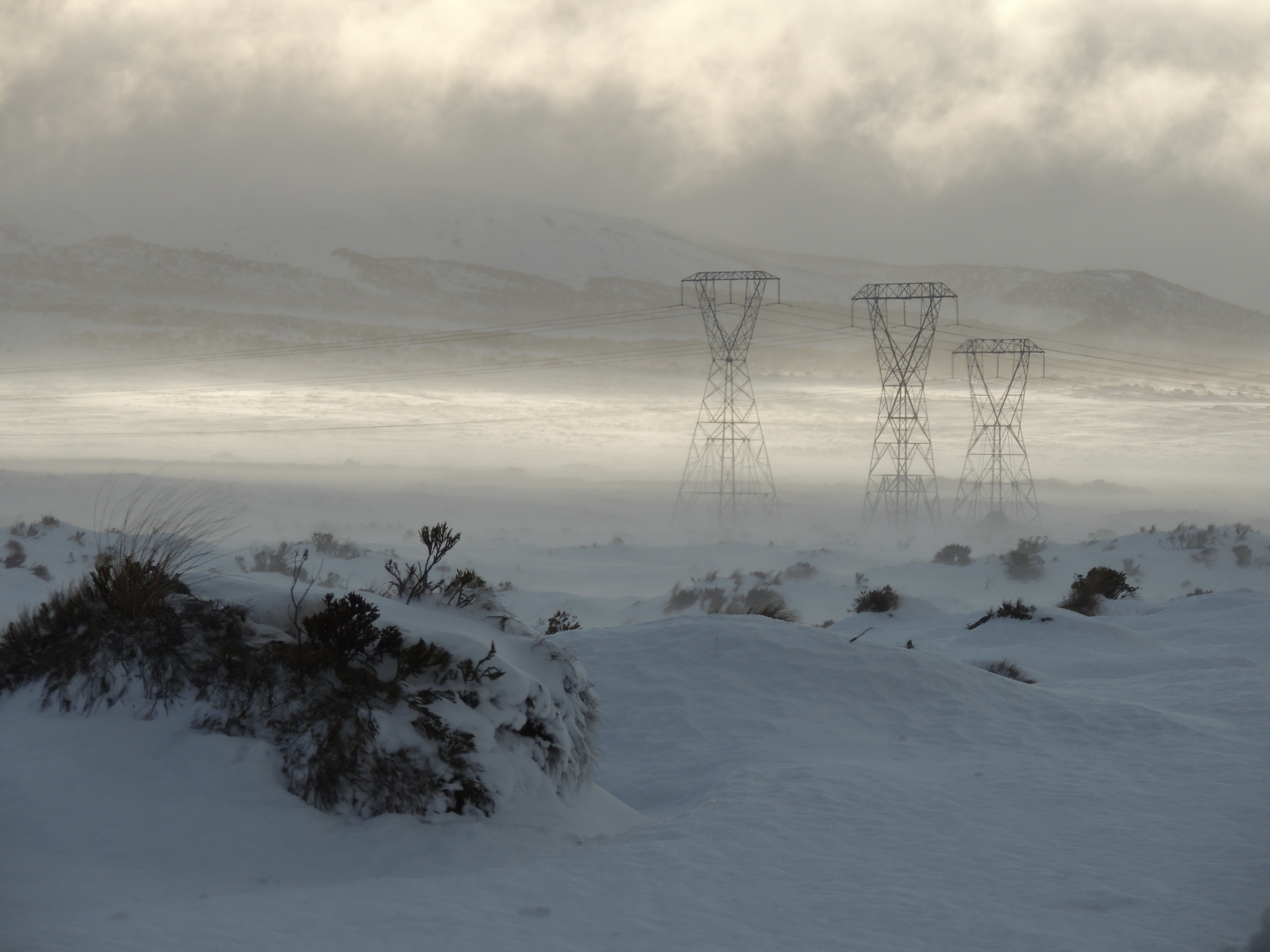
Central Plateau in winter

The main geographic factors that influence New Zealand's climate are the temperate latitude, with prevailing westerly winds; the oceanic environment; and the mountains, especially the Southern Alps. The climate is mostly temperate with mean temperatures ranging from 8 °C (46 °F) in the South Island to 16 °C (61 °F) in the North Island. January and February are the warmest months, July the coldest. New Zealand does not have a large temperature range, apart from central Otago, but the weather can change rapidly and unexpectedly. Near subtropical conditions are experienced in Northland. Most settled, lowland areas of the country have between 600 and 1,600 mm (24 and 63 in) of rainfall, with the most rain along the west coast of the South Island and the least on the east coast of the South Island and interior basins, predominantly on the Canterbury Plains and the Central Otago Basin (about 350 mm (14 in) PA). Christchurch is the driest city, receiving about 640 mm (25 in) of rain PA, while Hamilton is the wettest, receiving more than twice that amount at 1,325 mm (52.2 in) PA, followed closely by Auckland. The wettest area by far is the rugged Fiordland region, in the south-west of the South Island, which has between 5,000 and 8,000 mm (200 and 310 in) of rain PA, with up to 15,000 mm in isolated valleys, amongst the highest recorded rainfalls in the world.

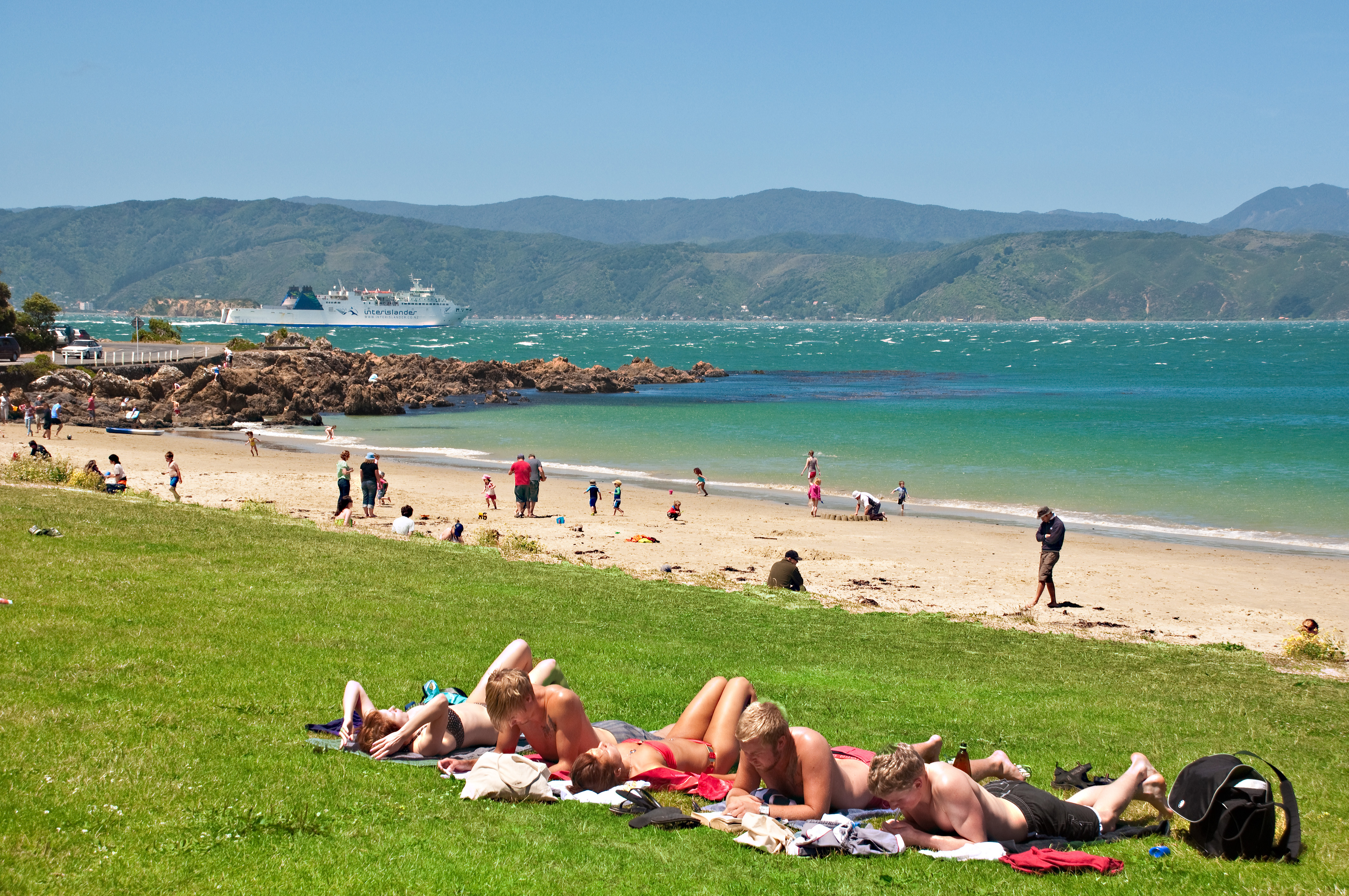
Scorching Bay, Wellington, in summer

The UV index can be very high and extreme in the hottest times of the year in the north of the North Island. This is partly due to the country's relatively little air pollution compared to many other countries and the high sunshine hours. New Zealand has very high sunshine hours with most areas receiving over 2000 hours per year. The sunniest areas are Nelson/Marlborough and the Bay of Plenty with 2,400 hours per year. The table below lists climate normals for the warmest and coldest months in New Zealand's six largest cities. North Island cities are generally warmest in February. South Island cities are warmest in January.

Average daily maximum and minimum temperatures for the six largest cities
Location	Jan/Feb (°C)	Jan/Feb (°F)	July (°C)	July (°F)
Auckland	23/16	74/60	14/7	58/45
Wellington	20/13	68/56	11/6	52/42
Christchurch	22/12	72/53	10/0	51/33
Hamilton	24/13	75/56	14/4	57/39
Tauranga	24/15	75/59	14/6	58/42
Dunedin	19/11	66/53	10/3	50/37

The combined effects of climate change in New Zealand will result in a multitude of irreversible impacts; by the end of this century New Zealand will experience higher rainfalls, more frequent extreme weather events and higher temperatures. In 2021, the Ministry for the Environment estimated that New Zealand's gross emissions were 0.17% of the world's total gross greenhouse gas emissions. However, on a per capita basis, New Zealand is a significant emitter, the sixth highest within the Annex I countries, whereas on absolute gross emissions New Zealand is ranked as the 24th highest emitter.

== Human geography ==
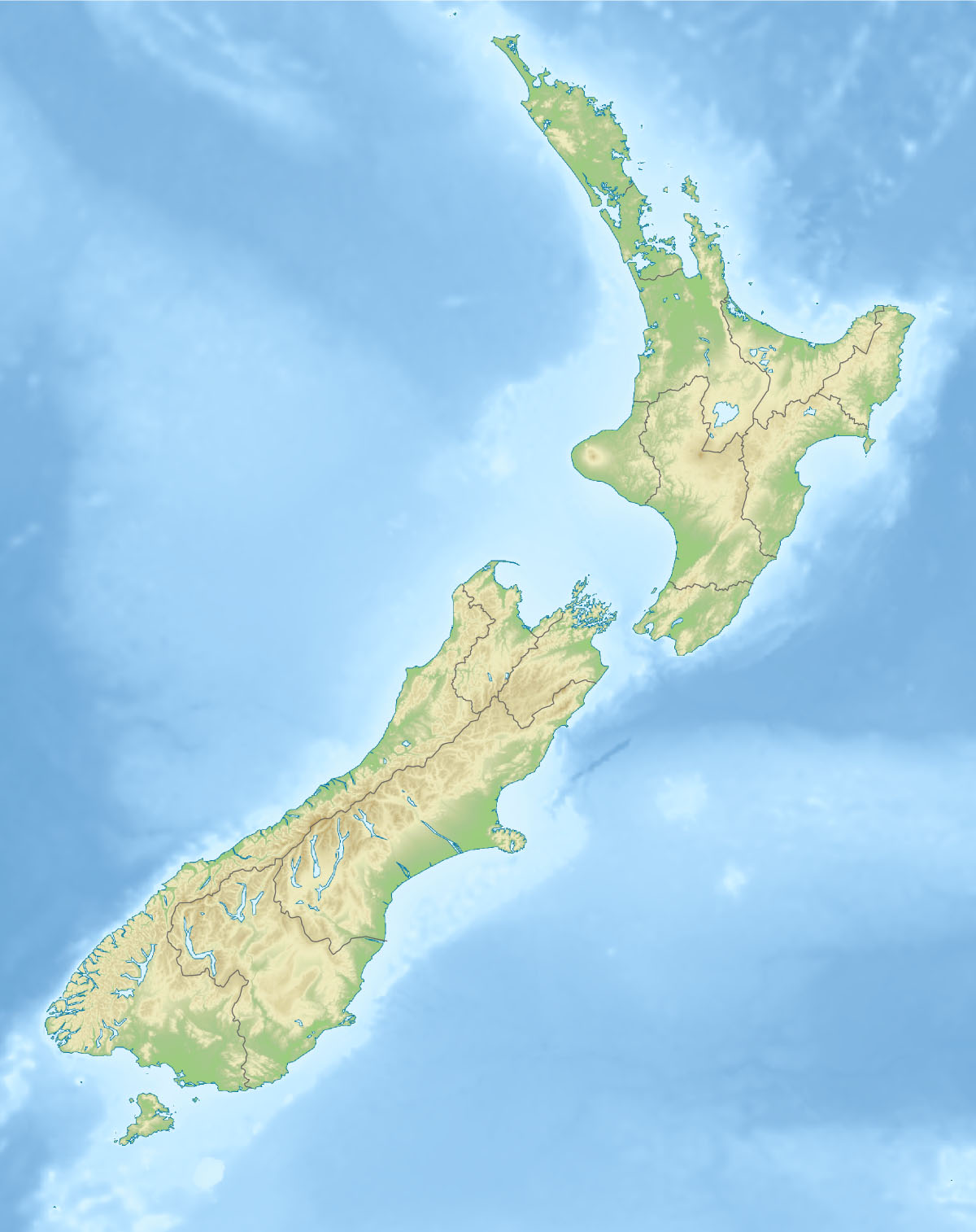
Annotated map displaying regional boundaries, major urban areas, and geographic features

=== Political geography ===
New Zealand has no land borders. However, the Ross Dependency, its claim in Antarctica, notionally borders the Australian Antarctic Territory to the west and unclaimed territory to the east. Most other countries do not recognise territorial claims in Antarctica.

New Zealand proper is divided administratively into sixteen regions: seven in the South Island and nine in the North. There is a physical geographical link, with regional boundaries being based largely on drainage basins. Among the regions, eleven are administered by regional authorities (top tier of local government), while five are unitary authorities that combine the functions of regional authorities and those of territorial authorities (second tier). Regional authorities are primarily responsible for environmental resource management, land management, regional transport, and biosecurity and pest management. Territorial authorities administer local roading and reserves, waste management, building consents, the land use and subdivision aspects of resource management, and other local matters.

The Chatham Islands is not a region, although its council operates as a region under the Resource Management Act. There are a number of outlying islands that are not included within regional boundaries. The Kermadecs and the Subantarctic Islands are inhabited only by a small number of Department of Conservation staff.

=== Population geography ===
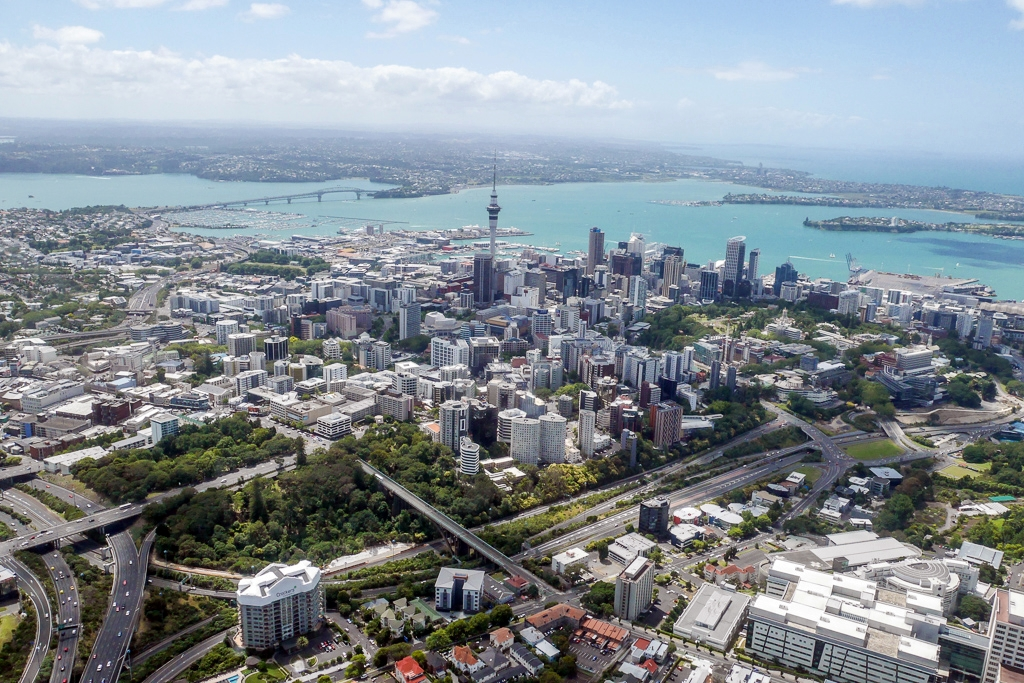
An aerial view of the Auckland urban area, showing its location on the Hauraki Gulf / Tīkapa Moana

Over the course of the 20th century, the population centre of New Zealand drifted to the north. Today the South Island contains a little under one-quarter of the population. Over three-quarters of New Zealand's population live in the North Island, with half living north of Lake Rotorua, and one-third of the total population living in the Auckland Region. Auckland is the fastest-growing region and is projected to account for half of New Zealand's population growth by 2050. The majority of the indigenous Māori people live in the North Island (87%), although a little under a quarter (24%) live in Auckland. New Zealand is a predominantly urban country, with 84.5% of the population living in an urban area. About 65.0% of the population live in the 20 main urban areas (population of 30,000 or more) and 44.3% live in the four largest cities of Auckland, Christchurch, Wellington, and Hamilton. (Other major urban areas include Tauranga, Dunedin, and Palmerston North.) New Zealand's population density of around 20 inhabitants per square kilometre (or 51 per sq mi) is among the lowest in the world.

New Zealand's peoples have been defined by their immigrant origin, the ongoing process of adaptation to a new land, being changed and changing those who came before. This process has led to a distinct distribution of culture across New Zealand. Here language and religion are used as markers for the far richer concept of culture. These metrics unfortunately exclude the political rural-urban divide and also the full effects of the Christchurch earthquakes on New Zealand's cultural distribution.

New Zealand's most widely spoken language is English (89.8%); however, language, dialect and accent vary spatially both within and between ethnic groups. The Māori language (3.5%) is spoken more commonly in areas with large Māori populations (Gisborne, Bay of Plenty and Northland). There are many sub dialects of Māori, the most pronounced division being between the northern and southern tribes. While migration (typically from north to south) was constant throughout the 16–18th centuries, the south maintained a distinct culture largely due to lack of cultivation possible at that latitude. English is spoken with regional accents relating to the origin of immigrants; for example Scottish and English 19th century immigration in Southland and Canterbury respectively. This has also occurred with more recent immigration, with a wide variety of accents being common in larger cities where immigrant groups have preferentially settled. These immigrant groups change location with time and accents fade over generations.

A wide variety of other languages make up the remaining approximately 6 percent of New Zealanders—with Samoan, Hindi, French and various Chinese dialects being the most common. These minority foreign languages are concentrated in the main cities, particularly Auckland where recent immigration groups have settled.

=== Agricultural geography ===
A relatively small proportion of New Zealand's land is arable (1.76 percent), and permanent crops cover 0.27 percent of the land. 7,210 square kilometres (2,780 sq mi) of the land is irrigated. As the world's largest exporter of sheep, New Zealand's agricultural industry focuses primarily on pastoral farming, particularly dairy and beef, as well as lambs. Dairy, specifically, is the top export. In addition to pastoral farming, fisherman harvest mussels, oysters and salmon, and horticulture farmers grow kiwifruit, as well as peaches, nectarines and other fruits. New Zealand's distance from world markets and spatial variation in rainfall, elevation and soil quality have defined the geography of its agriculture industry.

As of 2007, almost 55 percent of New Zealand's total land area was being used for farming, which is standard compared to most developed countries. Three-fourths of it was pastoral land using for raising sheep, cows, deer and other animals. The amount of farmland has decreased since 2002.

New Zealand's isolated location has simultaneously led to fewer pests and an agriculture industry with a greater susceptibility to introduced diseases and pests. A major concern for New Zealand farmers is the rapidly growing wild rabbit population. Wild rabbits have been an agricultural nuisance since their introduction to the country in the 1930s. They cause significant damage to farm lands: eating the grass, crops, and causing soil degradation. Many farmers are worried about their livelihoods and the effects that the rabbits will have on food supply and trade, as their numbers are quickly growing out of control. An illegal rabbit-killing virus called the rabbit haemorrhagic disease virus (RHDV) was released in 1997 by a group of vigilante farmers, and was very effective initially. After twenty years, however, the rabbits became immune to it. A new strain of the virus was released in March 2018, a Korean form of the strain called the K5 virus, or RHDV1-K5. This virus was introduced with the goal of exterminating 40 percent of the rabbit population. The new virus works much faster than the last one, expected to kill rabbits within two to four days of exposure. The virus has become a subject of debate among animal rights activists, due to the inhumane manner in which it kills the rabbits. However, farmers unanimously seem to be very grateful for the release of the virus.

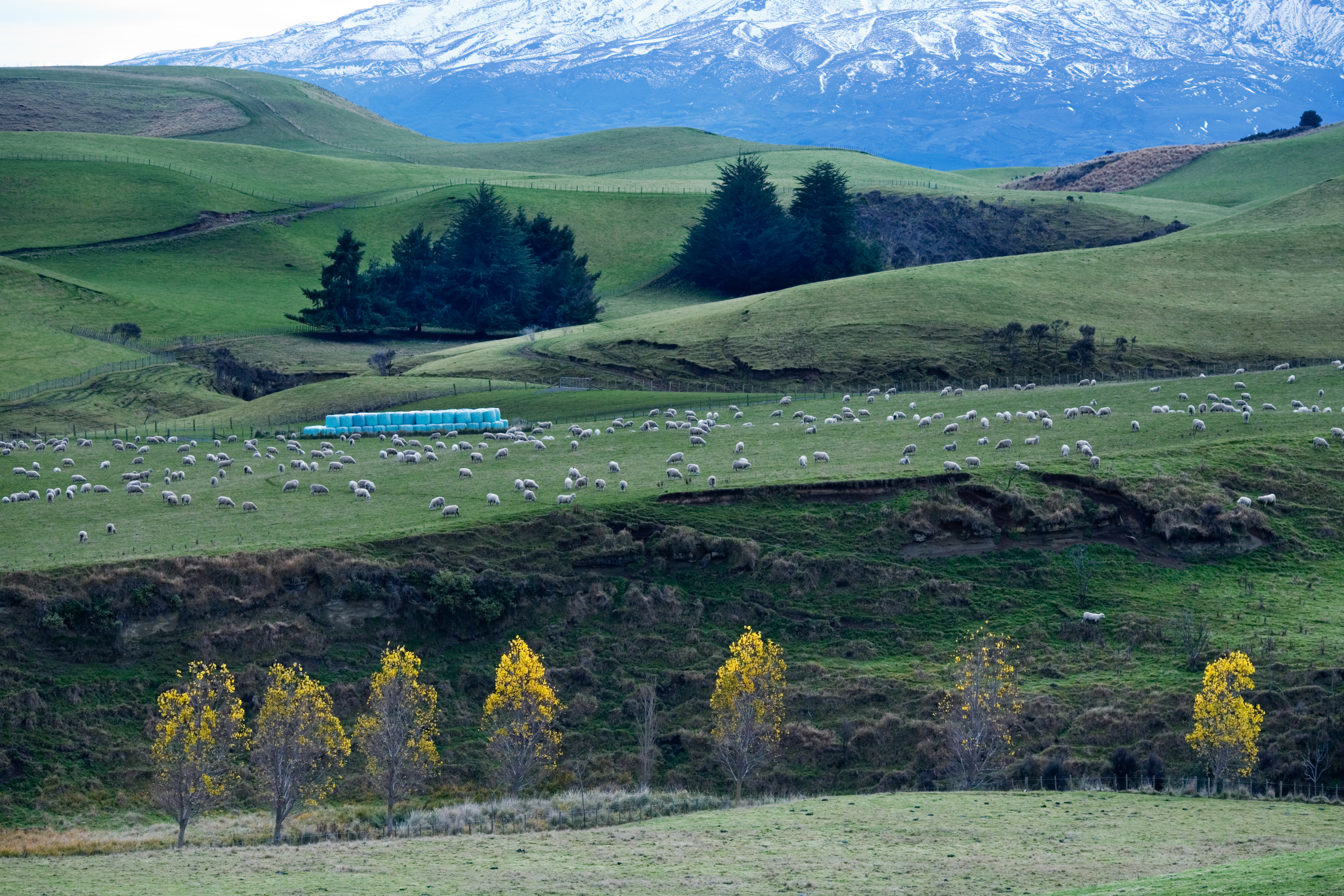
Rural landscape close to Mt Ruapehu

Almost half of New Zealand's climate change emissions are generated by greenhouse gases, mainly methane and nitrous oxide, which come from farming and agriculture. Organisms that grow inside of grazing animals' stomachs turn New Zealand's grass into methane. The increase of carbon dioxide in the air helps the plants to grow faster, but the long-term effects of climate change threaten farmers with the likelihood of more frequent and severe floods and droughts. Growers of kiwifruit, a major export in the horticulture industry of New Zealand, have experienced difficulties as a result of climate change. In the 2010s, warm winters did not provide the adequate cool temperatures needed for the flowering of kiwifruit, and this resulted in a reduction of the yield sizes. Droughts have also decreased apple production by causing sunburns and a lack of water available for irrigation. In contrast, the dairy industry has not been affected, and has adjusted well to the effects of climate change.

== Natural hazards ==
Flooding is the most regular natural hazard. New Zealand is swept by weather systems that bring heavy rain; settlements are usually close to hill-country areas which experience much higher rainfall than the lowlands due to the orographic effect. Mountain streams which feed the major rivers rise rapidly and frequently break their banks covering farms with water and silt. Close monitoring, weather forecasting, stopbanks, dams, and reafforestation programmes in hill country have ameliorated the worst effects.

New Zealand experiences around 14,000 earthquakes a year, some in excess of magnitude 7 (M7). Since 2010, several large (M7, M6.3, M6.4, M6.2) and shallow (all <7 km) earthquakes have occurred immediately beneath Christchurch. These have resulted in 185 deaths, widespread destruction of buildings and significant liquefaction. These earthquakes are releasing distributed stress in the Pacific plate from the ongoing collision with the Indo-Australian plate to the west and north of the city. Volcanic activity is most common on the central North Island Volcanic Plateau. Tsunamis affecting New Zealand are associated with the Pacific Ring of Fire.

Droughts are not regular and occur mainly in Otago and the Canterbury Plains and less frequently over much of the North Island between January and April. Forest fires were rare in New Zealand before the arrival of humans. During a designated summer season, lighting a fire in the open is banned on public conservation land.

== Environment and ecology ==
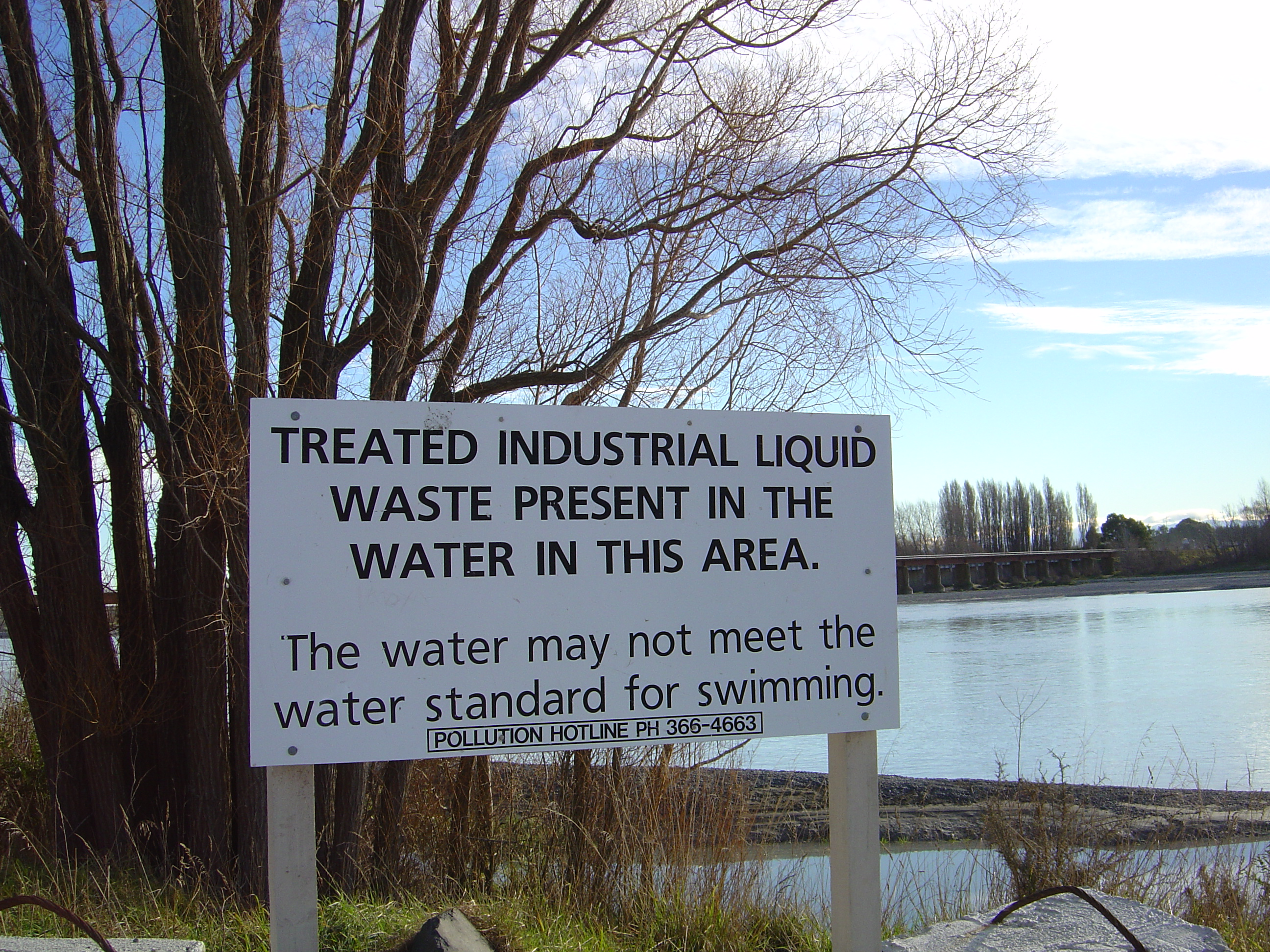
Water pollution sign on the Waimakariri River

New Zealand's geographic isolation for 80 million years and island biogeography has influenced evolution of the country's species of animals, fungi and plants. Physical isolation has not caused biological isolation, and this has resulted in a dynamic evolutionary ecology with examples of very distinctive plants and animals as well as populations of widespread species. There has been long-distance dispersal of plant life between mainland Australia and New Zealand, despite the 2,000 km (1,200 mi) separation. Evergreens such as the giant kauri and southern beech dominate the bush (native forests). The country also has a diverse range of birds, several of which are flightless such as the kiwi (a national symbol), the kākāpō, the takahē and the weka, and several species of penguins. Around 30 bird species are currently listed as endangered or critically endangered. Conservationists recognised that threatened bird populations could be saved on offshore islands, where, once predators were exterminated, bird life flourished again. Many bird species, including the giant moa, became extinct after the arrival of Polynesians, who brought dogs and rats, and Europeans, who introduced additional dog and rat species, as well as cats, pigs, ferrets, and weasels. Native flora and fauna continue to be hard-hit by invasive species. New Zealand conservationists have pioneered several methods to help threatened wildlife recover, including island sanctuaries, pest control, wildlife translocation, fostering, and ecological restoration of islands and other selected areas.

Massive deforestation occurred after humans arrived, with around half the forest cover lost to fire after Polynesian settlement. Much of the remaining forest fell after European settlement, being logged or cleared to make room for pastoral farming, leaving forest occupying only 23% of the land. New Zealand had a 2019 Forest Landscape Integrity Index mean score of 7.12/10, ranking it 55th globally out of 172 countries.

Pollution, particularly water pollution, is one of New Zealand's most significant environmental issues. Fresh water quality is under pressure from agriculture, hydropower, urban development, pest invasions and climate change, although much of the country's household and industrial waste is now increasingly filtered and sometimes recycled.

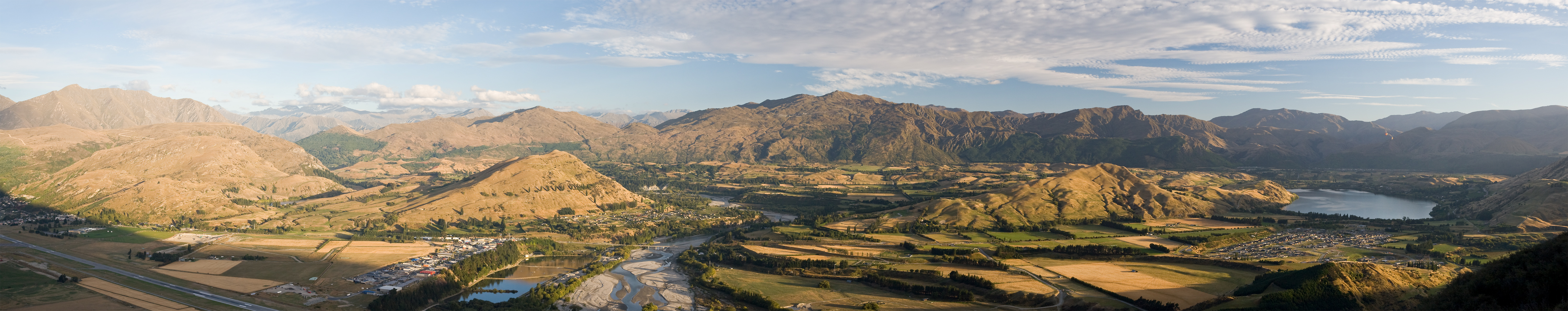
View from The Remarkables near Queenstown, Otago, South Island

=== Protected areas ===
Some areas of land, the sea, rivers or lakes are protected by law, so their special plants, animals, landforms and other distinctive features are sheltered from harm. New Zealand has three World Heritage Sites, 13 national parks, 34 marine reserves, and thousands of scenic, historic, recreation and other reserves. The Department of Conservation is responsible for managing 8.5 million hectares of public land (approximately 30% of New Zealand's total land area).

=== Environmental agreements ===
New Zealand is party to several multilateral environmental agreements. The major agreements are listed below.

- Antarctic Treaty
- Antarctic-Environmental Protocol
- Basel Convention
- Convention on Biological Diversity
- Convention on International Trade in Endangered Species
- Environmental Modification Convention
- International Convention for the Prevention of Pollution from Ships
- International Convention for the Regulation of Whaling
- International Tropical Timber Agreement, 1994
- Kyoto Protocol
- United Nations Convention to Combat Desertification
- London Dumping Convention
- Minamata Convention on Mercury
- Nouméa Convention
- Ramsar Convention
- Rotterdam Convention
- Stockholm Convention on Persistent Organic Pollutants
- United Nations Convention on the Law of the Sea
- United Nations Framework Convention on Climate Change
- Vienna Convention for the Protection of the Ozone Layer
- Waigani Convention

== Popular culture ==
New Zealand's varied landscape has appeared in television shows, such as Hercules: The Legendary Journeys and Xena: Warrior Princess. An increasing number of feature films have been shot on location in New Zealand for its scenery, including the Lord of the Rings trilogy.

New Zealand is often mistakenly omitted from world maps due to the country's physical geographic isolation, relatively small size (compared to Australia), and its positioning on the extreme bottom-right in many map projections such as the Mercator. The phenomenon has been popularly referenced and has a dedicated Reddit community.

== See also ==
- Australasian realm – One of Earth's eight biogeographic realms
- Geography of the South Island
- Geography of the North Island
- Natural history of New Zealand
