= Blue Lake (Raoul Island) =

- Location within Pacific Ocean
- Location: Raoul Island, Kermadec Islands
- Coordinates: 29°15′20″S 177°54′50″W
- Type: crater lake
- Basin countries: New Zealand

Blue Lake is the name of one of two tiny crater lakes on Raoul Island in New Zealand's Kermadec Islands, the other being Green Lake.

== See also ==
- Raoul Island: 2006 eruption
