= Cape Lovitt =

Westernmost point of New Zealand

Coordinates: 50.799838°S 165.870128°E

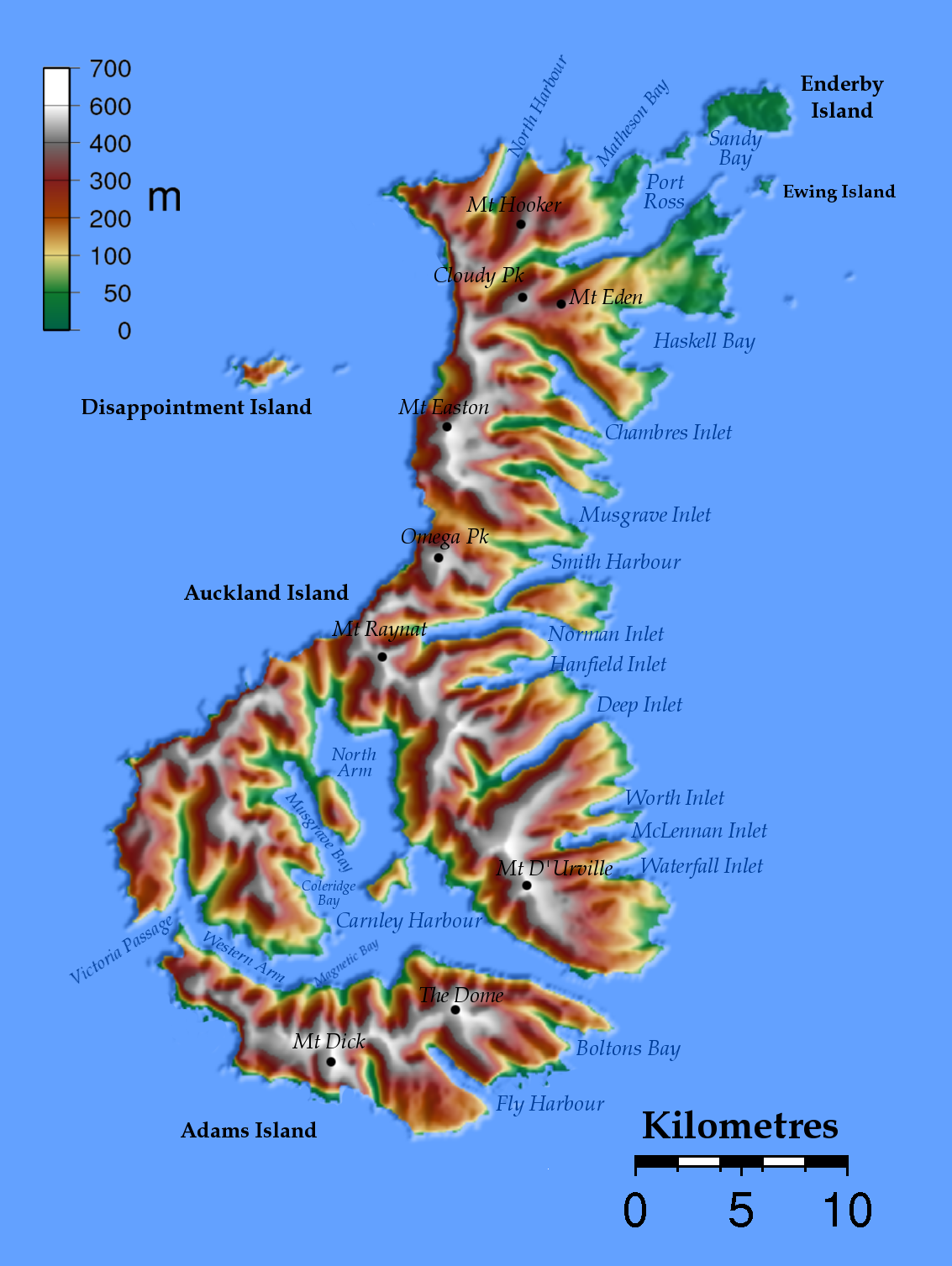
The Auckland Islands

Cape Lovitt is located on the west coast of Auckland Island, one of New Zealand's subantarctic outlying islands, 3 kilometres north of the mouth of Western Arm, a channel leading into Carnley Harbour and separating Auckland Island from Adams Island.

The cape is the westernmost point of New Zealand.

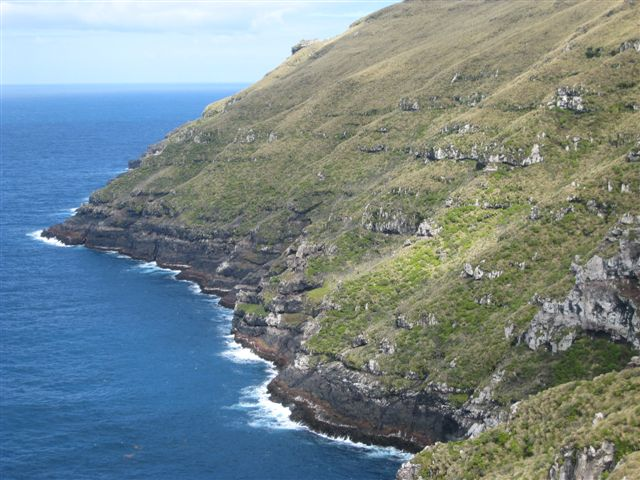
Cape Lovitt, the most Westerly Point in New Zealand, looking to the North up the Western side of Auckland Island
