= Green Lake (Raoul Island) =

Body of water on one of the Kermadec Islands, New Zealand

Coordinates: 29.2639°S 177.9193°W

Green Lake is one of two tiny crater lakes on Raoul Island in the Kermadec Islands, the other being Blue Lake. It covers an area of about 0.15 km^{2}. It erupted on 17 March 2006, killing Department of Conservation worker Mark Kearney, who was measuring the lake's temperature.
