= Moumoukai Peak =

Highest peak of Raoul Island, New Zealand

- Location within Pacific Ocean

Highest point
- Elevation: 516 m (1,693 ft)
- Prominence: 516 m (1,693 ft)
- Coordinates: 29°16′04″S 177°54′28″W

Geography
- Location: Raoul Island, Kermadec Islands

Climbing
- First ascent: unknown

Moumoukai Peak is a mountain situated on Raoul Island. Its peak is at an elevation of 516 m (1,693 ft).

== See also ==
- List of islands of New Zealand
- List of mountains of New Zealand by height
- New Zealand outlying islands
