= Nugent Island =

Island in New Zealand's Kermadec Islands

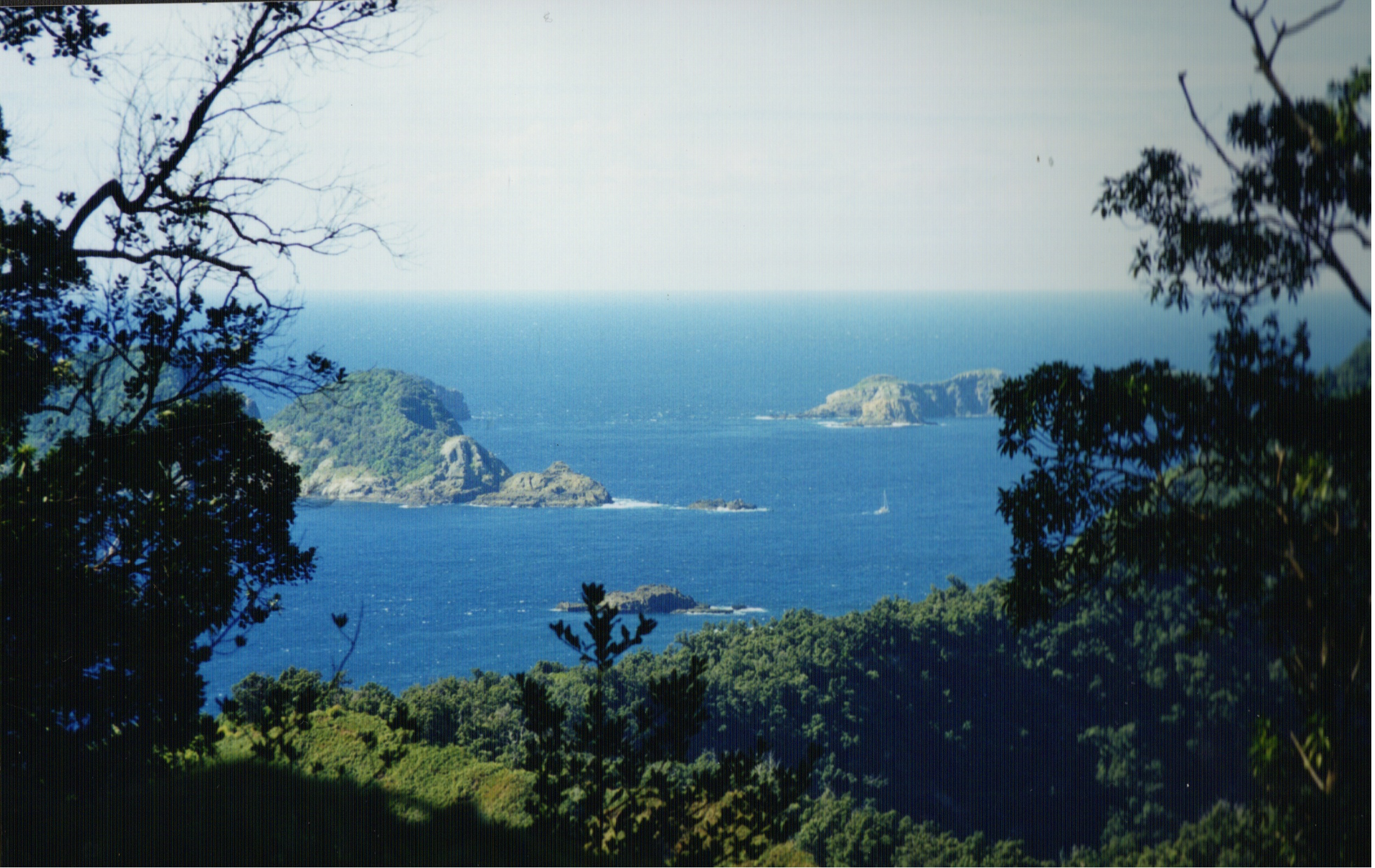
- Nugent Island (in the trees) near Raoul Island

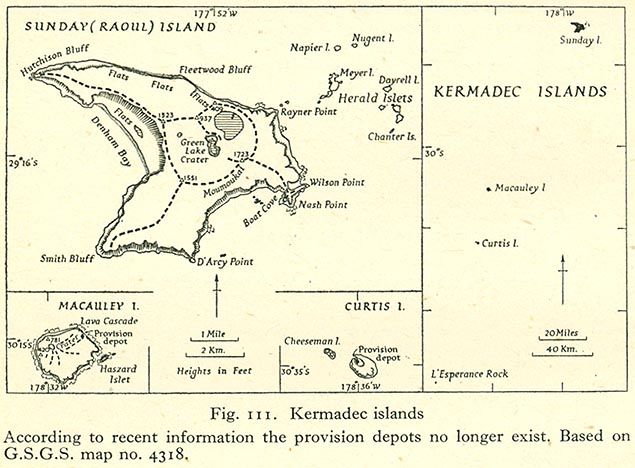
- Map from 1945 showing Nugent Island in relation to Raoul Island and others

Geography
- Coordinates: 29°13′54″S 177°52′09″W
- Archipelago: Kermadec Islands

Administration
- New Zealand

Demographics
- Population: 0

Nugent Island is the most northerly island in the Kermadec Islands and the most northerly part of New Zealand, being some 20 metres further to the North than nearby Napier Island. Nugent Island has a small island on the NW side with a narrow passage between. It is one of a group of islands to the north-east of Raoul Island. It is roughly circular and approximately 100 metres (330 ft) across, with a highest point of 66 m. The island has never been modified by introduced mammals, and so has retained its original bird populations. It forms part of the Kermadec Islands Important Bird Area, identified as such by BirdLife International because it is an important site for nesting seabirds.

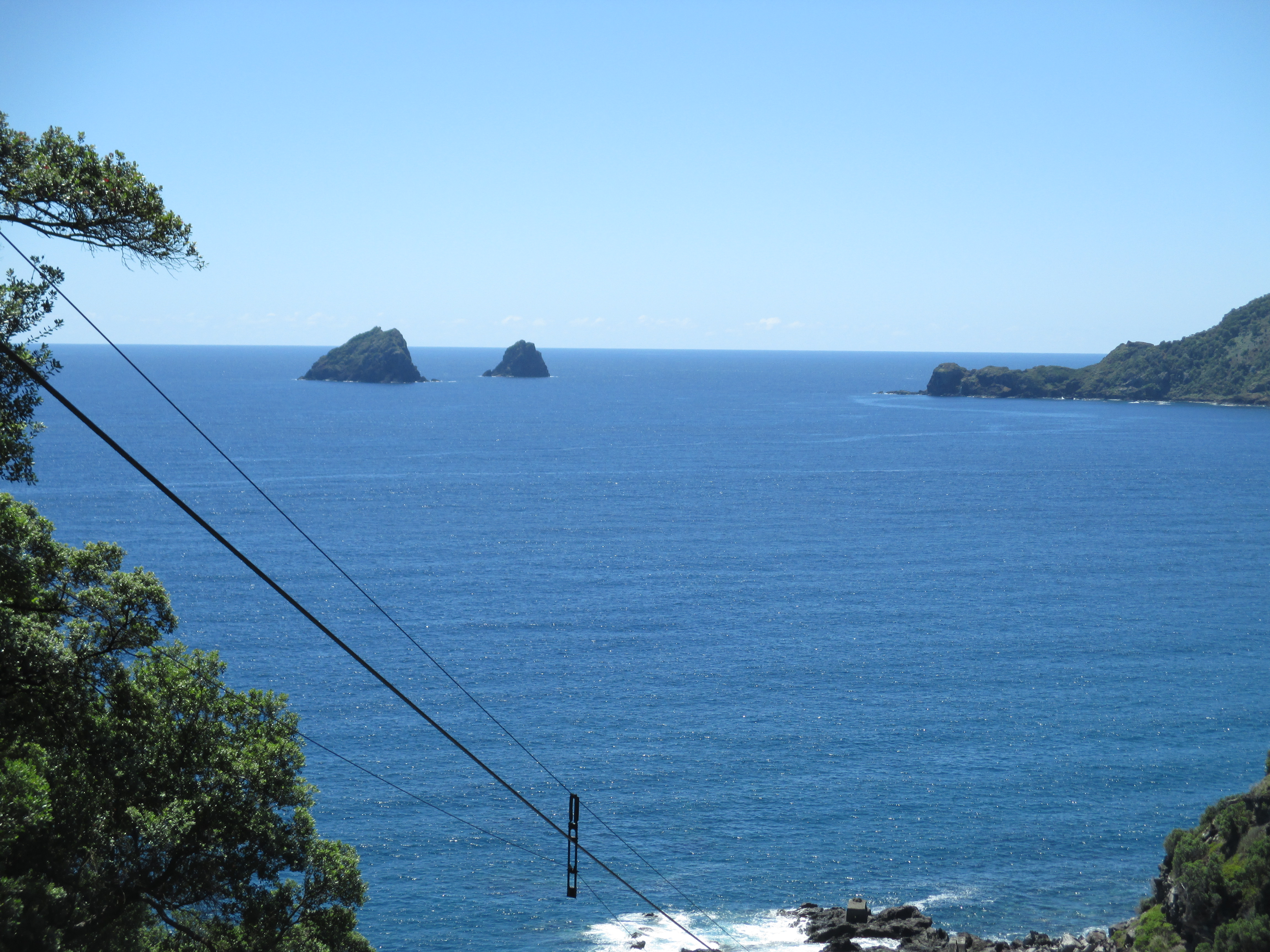
Napier Island, LHS - Nugent Island, Middle & North Meyer Island RHS - Kermadec Group - Aotearoa / New Zealand, from Raoul Island

== See also ==
- New Zealand outlying islands
- List of islands of New Zealand
- List of islands
- Desert island
