= Raoul Island =

Volcano in the Kermadec Islands, New Zealand

- Rangitāhua (Māori); Sunday Island
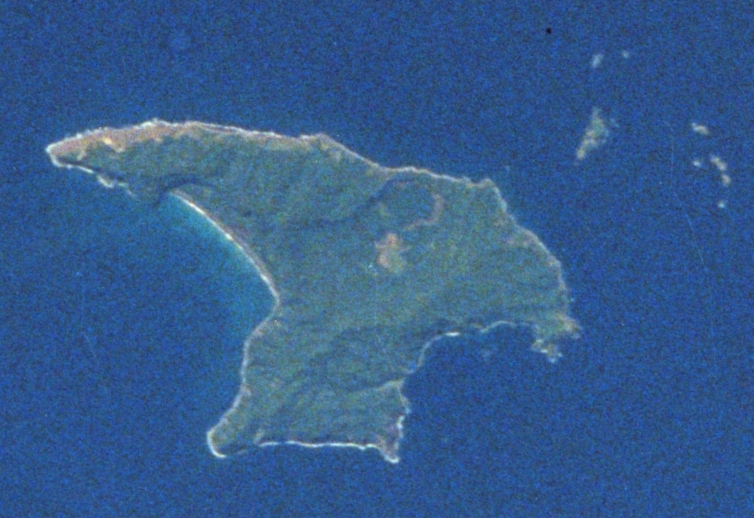
- Raoul Island as seen by STS-8 in 1983. Herald Islets at top right. North at top.

Highest point
- Elevation: 516 m (1,693 ft)
- Parent peak: Moumoukai Peak
- Coordinates: 29°16′S 177°55′W

Geography
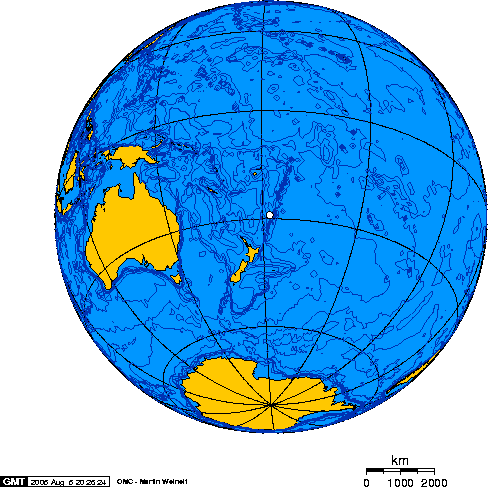
- Orthographic projection over Raoul Island
- Location: Kermadec Islands

Geology
- Formed by: Subduction zone volcanism
- Mountain type: Stratovolcano
- Volcanic arc: Kermadec Islands
- Last eruption: March 2006

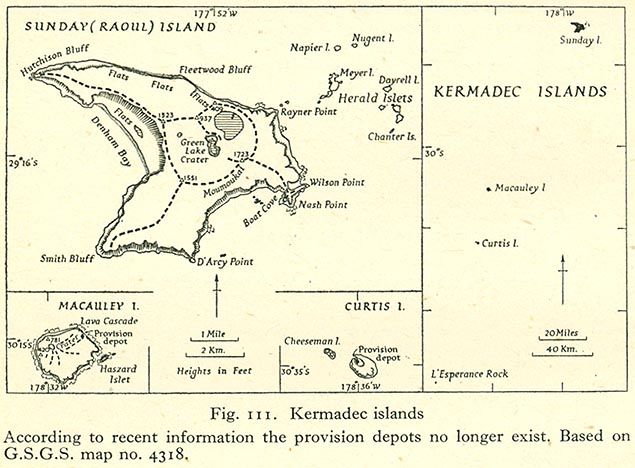
Map of the Kermadec Islands with Raoul Island

Raoul Island (Sunday Island; Māori: Rangitāhua) is the largest and northernmost of the main Kermadec Islands, 900 km (560 mi; 490 nmi) south south-west of 'Ata Island of Tonga and 1,100 km (680 mi; 590 nmi) north north-east of New Zealand's North Island. It has been the source of vigorous volcanic activity during the past several thousand years that was dominated by dacitic explosive eruptions, with the largest being VEI-6.

The anvil-shaped island has a total area of 29.38 km^{2} (11 sq mi). It has fringing islets and rocks mainly in the northeast, with a few smaller ones in the southeast. The highest elevation is Moumoukai Peak, at an elevation of 516 m (1,693 ft).

Although Raoul is the only island in the Kermadec group large enough to support settlement, it lacks a safe harbour, and landings from small boats can be made only in calm weather. The island consists of two mountainous areas, one with summits of 516 metres (1,693 ft) and 498 metres (1,634 ft), and the other with a summit of 465 metres (1,526 ft), the two separated by a depression which is the caldera of the Raoul volcano.

== History ==
Evidence from archaeological sites on the northern coast of Raoul Island indicate that Polynesians settled there in the 14th century. A 1980 publication also suggested a lower layer of deposits dated to the 10th century, but this was rejected by the paper's author in 1991 in favour of the later date. Finds at the sites included stone implements of the Polynesian type, obsidian flakes, shells and charcoal. Obsidian of the same type has been found at early Māori sites at Shag River / Waihemo and Tai Rua, Otago on the South Island of New Zealand. There are also similarities to the Raoul settlement at archaic sites at Houhora and Papatowai. Higham and Johnson (1997) concluded that Raoul was settled from New Zealand but that the Kermadecs were a stepping stone in an early and rapid Polynesian migration from Polynesia to New Zealand and back although the occupation of the islands was relatively brief.

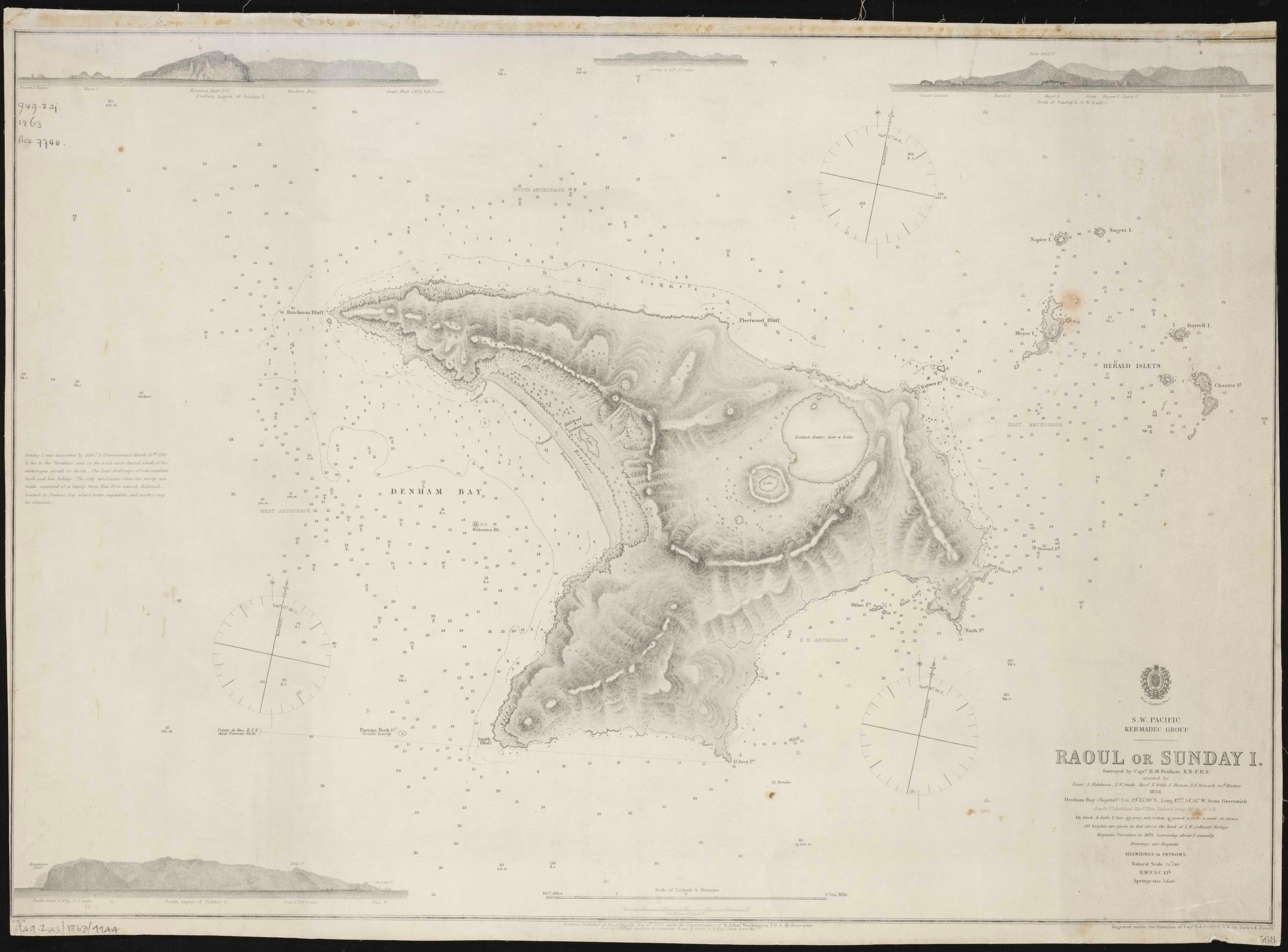
Admiralty chart of Raoul Island, surveyed by Denham in 1854

The island was uninhabited when first sighted by Western sailors and was named after Joseph Raoul, quartermaster of the Recherche, when it was sighted on 16 March 1793. Captain William Raven of the whaleship Britannia sighted the island on 6 March 1796 and called it Sunday Island, a name which was subsequently in common usage. Captain Henry Mangles Denham of HMS Herald charted the island in 1854.

The last regular occupants, Tom Bell and his wife Frederica, spent thirty-six years on the island before the New Zealand government evacuated them in 1914. A landing party sent to investigate the island found out how hasty the evacuation of the Bells was – a 1914 calendar was still pinned to the kitchen wall and the family's furniture, cutlery, and child's toys had remained in place. The family arrived with six children and five more were born there.

From 27 May to 16 June 1917, the German raider Wolf, under the command of Korvettenkapitän Karl August Nerger, anchored in the protected bay to undertake engine overhaul and maintenance. During this period Wolf captured the New Zealand steamship Wairuna (3,950 tons) and the American sailing bark Winslow (570 tons), commandeering all cargo and coal from both ships.

In May 1955 the British Defence Minister Selwyn Lloyd petitioned the Prime Minister of New Zealand Sidney Holland, to allow the British to conduct their first thermonuclear test on Raoul Island. Sidney Holland refused and the British Government later conducted their tests on Malden Island and Christmas Island in the Gilbert and Ellice Islands Colony.

=== Weather station ===
The New Zealand government has permanently staffed Raoul Island since 1937 until the evacuation of staff at the beginning of 2020 due to uncertainties around the COVID-19 pandemic. It included a government meteorological and radio station and hostel for Department of Conservation (DOC) officers and volunteers. The station stands on the northern terraces of the island, about 50 m (164 ft) in elevation above the cliffs of Fleetwood Bluff.

The meteorological station (WMO ID 93997) was initially operated by New Zealand Post Office staff operating the radio station, but shortly after the end of World War 2, the New Zealand Meteorological Service took over the running of the station, with nine full-time staff. Each team undertook 12-month expeditions to the island to provide three hourly weather reports and once daily radiosonde flights using hydrogen filled balloons at 10:30 am. Weather reports were radioed back to New Zealand using HF radio to ZLW Wellington Radio.

In addition to its primary purpose as a meteorological station, staff at the station also maintained a seismic monitoring station, made once a week measurements of sea temperature at Fishing Rock and the lake levels and temperatures of Blue and Green Lakes.

In 1990 the surface weather observation programme was automated and the Department of Conservation took over responsibility for operational activities on the island.

Raoul Island Station remains the northernmost outpost of New Zealand.

=== 2006 eruption – Mark Kearney ===
On 17 March 2006 at 8:21 a.m. NZDT, a 40-second long volcanic eruption occurred at the Green Lake. At the time, Mark Kearney, a DOC worker, was at the crater taking water temperature measurements. A 5-hectare (12-acre) area around Green Lake was affected with ash, mud and boulders. Two DOC workers were forced to turn back after going to the crater to search for Kearney.

Following the eruption, DOC decided to evacuate the remaining five staff members. A Mil Mi-8 helicopter and Piper PA-31 Navajo aircraft took off from Taupō at 11 a.m. that morning. They arrived at the island in the late afternoon and undertook a 45-minute search for Kearney, but no sign was seen. The evacuated staff members were brought back to Auckland that evening.

A Royal New Zealand Air Force P-3 Orion made an overflight on 21 March to provide further information on how safe it was to approach Green Lake. The volcanologists aboard decided the area was still unsafe, and that the crater lake had risen by about 8 metres (26.2 ft) compared to measurements taken on 17 March. There was no cloud or ash plume.

A group of police, the five evacuated workers, three other DOC staff and scientific staff left Tauranga on 18 March for the three-day boat trip to Raoul aboard the RV Braveheart to recover Kearney's body. They were able to undertake a limited search, but decided that it was extremely unlikely that Kearney survived given the amount of devastation in the area around Green Lake. The Braveheart began the journey back to the mainland on 25 March, with three of the DOC workers staying on the island to continue research. The three were joined by the other four evacuated workers at the start of May 2006. Two of the three will return to the mainland after the handover.

Five hours after the eruption, the Aura satellite passed over and found an estimated 200 tonnes (197 long tons; 220 short tons) of sulfur dioxide had been released. This confirmed that there were magmatic gases in the eruption, and the presence of degassing magma within the volcano. By the end of April, the activity in the area had decreased significantly and the "Alert Level" was lowered to 1.

HMNZS Te Mana left for Raoul on 24 August 2006 on a resupply mission. Also on board were Kearney's sister, Merryn McDermott; three representatives of the Ngāti Kurī iwi; and Chris Carter, the Minister of Conservation. During a service held on 28 August, the Ngāti Kurī representatives performed a tapu lifting ceremony. A plaque was erected to honour Kearney. Te Mana also allowed some volcanic monitoring to be undertaken using its SH-2G Super Seasprite helicopter. During a dawn flight, sample bottles were filled with crater lake water.

A report by the New Zealand Department of Labour into the death was released on 14 October 2006. It cleared the Department of Conservation and the Institute of Geological and Nuclear Sciences Ltd of any negligence related to the death of Kearney. The report stated that the eruption was unpredictable and there was no indication of imminent seismic activity.

Located on an active margin between two tectonic plates, the Kermadec Islands also experience frequent earthquakes, the most recently significant of which occurred at 19:28:31 UTC on 4 March 2021. The epicentre occurred south of Raoul and measured 8.1 on the moment magnitude scale, and as such is classified as a 'major' earthquake by the United States Geological Survey. Also of note on 31 January 2007 at 4:15:55 NZST a Magnitude 6.5 (Strong) earthquake shook the island. The epicentre was approximately 40 km (25 mi) S of Raoul and 10 km (6.2 mi) below the seabed. On 9 December 2007 at 8:28 pm NZST a magnitude 7.6 earthquake shook the area, centred approximately 350 km (220 mi) north of Raoul Island at a depth of 188 km (117 mi). On 30 September 2008 at 3:19:31 NZST a magnitude 7.0 earthquake centred 70 km (43 mi) S of Raoul occurred, with an approximate depth of 35 km (22 mi). More recently on 22 October 2011 at 05:57:17 NZST a Magnitude 7.4 earthquake originating at 28.941S 176.045W at a depth of 39 km occurred according to the United States Geological Survey.

=== July 2011 earthquake ===
7 July 2011 – 7:03 am. A 7.6 Magnitude earthquake occurred at a depth of 24 km, 211 km east of Raoul Island. 7 July 2011 – 8:51 am Pacific Tsunami Warning Centre scientist Barry Hirshorn told Newstalk ZB the quake generated a 1.9 metre tsunami at Raoul Island.

=== October 2011 earthquake ===
22 October 2011 – 5:57 pm. A 7.4 magnitude earthquake occurred at a depth of 45 kilometres (28 miles), 230 km (143 mi) east of Raoul Island.

The Ministry of Civil Defence had issued the advisory while it assessed the severity of the threat to New Zealand. The Ministry was warning people in coastal areas to stay off beaches and out of the water. People were advised to avoid sightseeing and remain on alert in case the earthquake had generated a tsunami, however by mid-morning warnings had lifted.

=== 2012 – Mihai Muncus-Nagy ===
Department of Conservation volunteer Mihai Muncus-Nagy, a 33-year-old biologist from Romania, went missing on Raoul Island on 2 January 2012. He had gone to Raoul at the end of October 2011. His vehicle and gear were found close to where he had been carrying out water temperature readings on the morning of 2 January 2012.

The remaining staff and volunteers searched the shore, but found no further sign of him. A helicopter was sent to Raoul by the Rescue Coordination Centre New Zealand (RCCNZ) from Taupō to carry out an aerial search. A DOC boat was also used in the search.

Muncus-Nagy was presumed drowned. Auckland District Court later found the Department of Conservation culpable in his death for failing to ensure his safety.

=== March 2021 earthquake ===
4 March 2021 – 08:28 local time. An 8.1 magnitude earthquake occurred at a depth of 26.5 kilometres (16.5 mi), 4 km (2.5 mi) east of Raoul Island. Owing to the COVID-19 pandemic, the island was uninhabited at the time. The earthquake led to a tsunami warning for much of New Zealand, and evacuation of some coastal regions of the North Island.

== Geography ==
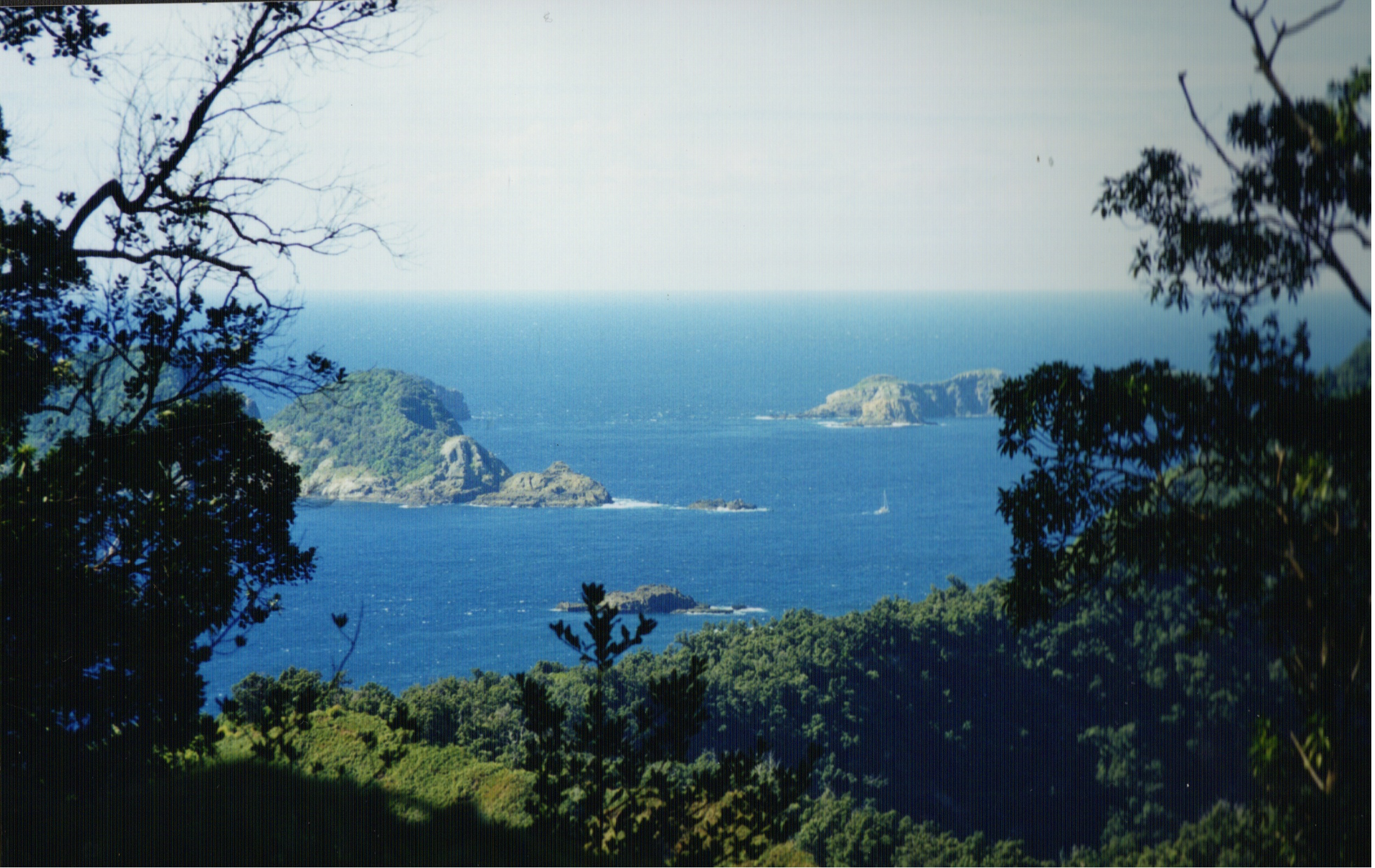
Raoul Island, looking towards the minor islands northeast

The island is about 1,100 km (680 mi; 590 nmi) northeast of Auckland and its location means it is a convenient earthquake and tsunami monitoring station for several Pacific nations. Two Holocene calderas are found at Raoul. The older caldera, which cuts the centre of Raoul Island, is about 3.5 km × 2.5 km (2.2 mi × 1.6 mi) long and wide respectively. Denham caldera, formed during a major dacitic explosive eruption about 2200 years ago, truncated the western side of the island and is 6.5 km × 4 km (4.0 mi × 2.5 mi) long and wide respectively.

The Denham caldera was named for the nearby Denham Bay, itself named by Royal Navy Captain Henry Mangles Denham in HMS Herald, who came to complete a (chart) survey of the island on 2 July 1854. His son Fleetwood James Denham (16yrs) died from a tropical fever, and was buried near the beach at the head of Denham Bay, where a number of the grass-grown graves of former settlers were. The brass plaque heading this grave has been preserved.

Three small lakes, Blue Lake (1.17 km^{2} or 0.45 sq mi, about 40% overgrown), Green Lake (160,000 m^{2} or 1,700,000 sq ft) and Tui Lake (5,000 m^{2} or 54,000 sq ft, drinking water quality) are located in the northern caldera of Raoul Island. The floor of the caldera surrounding the lakes is called Pumice Flats.

=== Climate ===
Raoul Island has a humid subtropical climate (Cfa) close to the border of tropical climate (Af). On 12 February 2022, the minimum temperature in the Raoul Island was 25.6 °C, this is the highest minimum temperature ever recorded in New Zealand.

Climate data for Raoul Island
Month	Jan	Feb	Mar	Apr	May	Jun	Jul	Aug	Sep	Oct	Nov	Dec	Year
Record high °C (°F)	31.1 (88.0)	30.7 (87.3)	29.5 (85.1)	28.4 (83.1)	25.7 (78.3)	24.2 (75.6)	23.5 (74.3)	23.0 (73.4)	23.1 (73.6)	25.0 (77.0)	26.7 (80.1)	28.7 (83.7)	31.0 (87.8)
Mean daily maximum °C (°F)	25.0 (77.0)	25.7 (78.3)	24.9 (76.8)	23.6 (74.5)	21.7 (71.1)	20.1 (68.2)	19.1 (66.4)	19.0 (66.2)	19.6 (67.3)	20.5 (68.9)	22.0 (71.6)	23.6 (74.5)	22.1 (71.8)
Daily mean °C (°F)	22.3 (72.1)	23.1 (73.6)	22.4 (72.3)	20.9 (69.6)	19.0 (66.2)	17.4 (63.3)	16.9 (62.4)	17.0 (62.6)	17.1 (62.8)	17.7 (63.9)	19.2 (66.6)	20.9 (69.6)	20.7 (69.3)
Mean daily minimum °C (°F)	19.7 (67.5)	20.5 (68.9)	19.9 (67.8)	18.3 (64.9)	16.4 (61.5)	14.8 (58.6)	13.7 (56.7)	13.3 (55.9)	14.0 (57.2)	14.9 (58.8)	16.4 (61.5)	18.2 (64.8)	16.7 (62.1)
Record low °C (°F)	13.6 (56.5)	14.3 (57.7)	13.4 (56.1)	10.5 (50.9)	10.4 (50.7)	9.0 (48.2)	8.1 (46.6)	7.4 (45.3)	8.5 (47.3)	9.3 (48.7)	10.4 (50.7)	12.5 (54.5)	7.4 (45.3)
Average precipitation mm (inches)	128 (5.0)	153 (6.0)	162 (6.4)	102 (4.0)	129 (5.1)	171 (6.7)	150 (5.9)	132 (5.2)	110 (4.3)	86 (3.4)	94 (3.7)	141 (5.6)	1,558 (61.3)
Mean monthly sunshine hours	276.4	244.8	201.2	168.3	148.4	129.6	144.5	168.6	199.4	228.4	219.8	258.6	2,388
Source 1: NIWA National Climate Database
Source 2: Météo Climat (extremes) all-time extreme temperature

=== Geology ===
Raoul Island is a stratovolcano on the Tonga–Kermadec Ridge which is a back-arc volcanic chain associated with the 4 to 5 million year old Kermadec–Tonga subduction zone. Its formative lavas have erupted over at least the last 1.5 million years and range from basaltic to rhyolitic in composition. There was a change from predominantly basaltic and andesitic volcanism to the more silicic dacite and rhyolitic volcanism about 3700 years ago.

The Raoul volcano massif is over twice the area of the island extending off the seafloor 28 by 20 km (17 by 12 mi) and has a total volume of 214 km^{3} (51 cu mi). Denham caldera's long axis is parallel to the tectonic fabric of the Havre Trough that lies west of the volcanic arc. There is a large undersea caldera about 15 km (9.3 mi) to the northeast of the island in the volcanic edifice.

About 20 km (12 mi) south of Raoul Island is a separate submarine volcanic edifice referred to as Raoul SW, and further on the volcanic Macauley Island.

Historical eruptions at Raoul during the 19th and 20th centuries have sometimes occurred simultaneously from both of the island's calderas, and have consisted of small-to-moderate phreatic eruptions, some of which formed ephemeral islands in Denham caldera. A 240 m (787 ft) high unnamed submarine cone, one of several located along a fissure on the lower NNE flank of Raoul volcano, has also erupted during historical time, and satellite vents at Raoul are concentrated along two parallel NNE-trending lineaments.

Eruptions of Raoul Volcano (Note: Several eruptions have been assigned to Raoul volcano on tephra composition evidence alone and are therefore not definite. One reason for this may be that eruptive history of the large submarine caldera structure in the northeast of the Raoul volcano edifice has not been studied. Another reason might be that to date not all the composition studies that have been done, on sea floor core samples, have been published in the peer reviewed literature)
Start Date	End Date	VEI	Scale	Type	Comment
17 March 2006	17 March 2006	1	Minor	-	One death. The eruption lasted 30 minutes and 200 t (200 long tons; 220 short tons) of sulfur dioxide gas emitted.
19 November 1964	25 April 1964	2	Minor	Phreatic	From west side Green Lake and Denham caldera
March 1886	Unknown	0	Minor	-	In sea about 7.5 km (4.7 mi) NEE from Raoul Island, floating pumice observed.
20 June 1870 ± 4 days	3 October 1870	3	Minor	Phreatomagmatic	from Denham caldera and Green Lake. Two islands formed in Denham Bay which by 1877 were eroded to sealevel.
9 March 1814	Unknown	3	Minor	Phreatomagmatic	From Denham caldera and Smith Crater. A 4 km (2.5 mi) circumference island, formed in Denham Bay, which had disappeared by 1854.
approx. 1620	Unknown	-	-	Phreatic	Smith Breccia
1720 ± 50 CE	Unknown	4	Major	Phreatic	From Tui Lake
1720	Unknown	-	-	Dacite	Sentinel tephra from possibly Denham caldera may be same eruptive sequence to Tui
1630 ± 50 CE	Unknown	4	Major	Dacite	Rangitahua Crater
1450 CE	Unknown	-	-	Basaltic andesite	Meyer Islands identified by tephrochronology
850 CE	Unknown	4	Major	Phreatic	Expedition breccia
700 CE	Unknown	3	Minor	Phreatic	Pukekohu Crater
550 CE	Unknown	4	Major	Dacite	Green Lake
about 500 CE	Unknown	-	-	Dacite	Pumice layer floated from crater lake dome
400 CE	Unknown	4	Major	Dacite	Raynor tephra from south Raoul caldera
100 CE	Unknown	4	Major	Basaltic andesite	Judith tephra from north flank of Moumoukai
50 BCE	Unknown	3	Minor	Dacite	Bell tephra
250 ± 75 BCE	Unknown	6	Major	Dacite	Fleetwood tephra from Denham caldera. At one studied spot on the island 40 m (130 ft) of pumice is overlain by 80 m (260 ft) of ignimbrite pyroclastic flow.
1200 ± 150 BCE	Unknown	4	Major	Dacite	Oneraki tephra, from southwest part of Raoul caldera
2000 ± 100 BCE	Unknown	4	Major	Dacite	Matatirohia tephra, from south east part of Raoul caldera
10,000 BCE	4000 BCE	-	-	Basaltic andesite	Moumoukai formation assigned to Raoul
100,000 BCE	50,000 BCE	-	-	Basaltic andesite	Hutchison formation assigned to Denham caldera location
200,000 BCE	100,000 BCE	-	-	Basalt and basaltic andesite	D'Arcy formation assigned to Denham caldera location
1,400,000 BCE	600,000 BCE	-	-	Basalt and basaltic andesite	Boat Cove formation

=== Volcanic risk ===
Immediate volcanic risk at Raoul is confined to any who are on the island at the time, or shipping in the vicinity. However larger eruptions could pose a serious danger to aircraft on commercial routes and generate tsunami. The eruption of about 250 BCE was about the same size as the 1883 eruption of Krakatoa.

== Flora and fauna ==
The scientific categorisation of the flora and fauna of the island began in 1854 when HMS Herald, captained by Henry Mangles Denham, arrived to complete the charting of the island. He arrived on the 2nd and was occupied till 24 July, during which time he frequently had to move the ship on account of the rough weather experienced. William Grant Milne and John MacGillivray, naturalists on board the Herald, made a small collection of plants on Raoul. This was forwarded by Captain Denham to Sir W. Hooker, and was described by Sir Joseph Hooker in the Journal of the Linnean Society for 1857.

A ten-month scientific expedition was undertaken by a group of naturalists to the Kermadec Islands in 1908. The expedition established its base at Denham Bay. During that expedition one of the naturalists, W. L. Wallace, discovered numerous new insect species including the beetle Saprosites raoulensis. The first specimens of the Kermadec koromiko, Veronica breviracemosa, were also collected in the expedition by Walter Oliver, but the species was not found again for decades and was feared extinct, wiped out by goats. A single living plant was discovered in 1983 during goat eradication, and 50 more in 1997; the species is now being propagated and replanted on the island.

Raoul is part of the Kermadec Islands subtropical moist forests ecoregion and is largely covered with closed-canopy forest, predominantly of the evergreen Kermadec pōhutukawa (Metrosideros kermadecensis) and the Kermadec nikau palm (Rhopalostylis baueri, formerly described as Rhopalostylis cheesemanii). It is just far enough south that the occasional fertile coconut from Polynesia that washes up on shore and takes root will not survive in the longterm due to a lack of warmth. The island has no native land mammals and was formerly home to vast colonies of seabirds who nested in the forests. The islands may once have had a species of megapode (based on early settler records) and a subspecies of kererū. Currently, landbirds on the island include the Kermadec red-crowned parakeet (Cyanoramphus novaezelandiae cyanurus), the Australasian harrier, pūkeko, tūī and several introduced species. The island forms part of the Kermadec Islands Important Bird Area, identified as such by BirdLife International because it is an important site for nesting seabirds.

Polynesian visitors introduced the Polynesian rat in the 14th century and Norway rats, cats and goats were introduced by European and American visitors in the 19th and 20th centuries. The rats and cats greatly reduced the seabird colonies, which mostly withdrew to offshore islets, and exterminated the red-crowned parakeet, the last confirmed record of resident parakeets for over a century being made in 1836. Although the goats did not eliminate the tree canopy as they did on other islands, they greatly reduced the understorey vegetation and were removed in 1984. The Department of Conservation eradicated rats and cats between 2002 and 2006, following which red-crowned parakeets soon returned naturally, presumably from the Herald Islets, 2–4 km (1.2–2.5 mi) away. The parakeets had been absent from the island for 150 years and their natural return was a notable event in parrot conservation.

There are numerous invasive plant species on the island and a large scale weeding programme involving teams of DOC workers and volunteers has been under way for a number of years in an attempt to eradicate them. Myrtle rust was found on the island in 2017.

The island is part of the Kermadec Islands Marine Reserve, New Zealand's largest marine reserve, which was created in 1990.

== Satellite islands and rocks ==
The two largest satellite islands are North Island and South Island of Meyer Islands.

- Islands and rocks in the northeast of Raoul Island
  - Fishing Rock
  - Egeria Rock
  - Meyer Islands
    - North Island
    - South Island
  - Napier
  - Nugent Island (northernmost island of New Zealand)
  - Herald Islets
    - Dayrell Island
    - Chanter Islands
      - Chanter (North) Island
      - South Island
      - West Island
- Islands and rocks in the southwest of Raoul Island
  - Milne Islands
  - Dougall Rocks

== See also ==
- List of earthquakes in New Zealand
- List of extinct bird species since 1500
- List of islands of New Zealand
- List of volcanoes in New Zealand
- Lists of islands
- New Zealand outlying islands
- Uninhabited island
