= New Zealand outlying islands =

Nine small groups of islands belonging to New Zealand

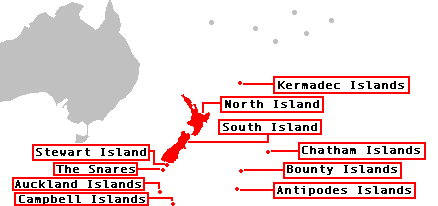
Map of the New Zealand outlying islands in relation to the main New Zealand archipelago

The New Zealand outlying islands are nine offshore island groups that are part of New Zealand, with all but Solander Islands lying beyond the 12 nautical miles limit of the mainland's territorial waters. Although considered integral parts of New Zealand, seven of the nine island groups are not part of any administrative region or district, but are instead each designated as an Area Outside Territorial Authority. The two exceptions are the Chatham Islands, which are covered by their own special territorial authority, and the Solander Islands, which are part of the Southland Region and Southland District.

Eight island groups sit on the New Zealand continental shelf, which forms a part of Zealandia. The Kermadec Islands, northeast of mainland New Zealand, are on a ridge, whose location as part or not part of Zealandia is not yet proven by geologists. Both sources show a map drawn of Zealandia, marking the location of islands north and south of New Zealand.

The term is also used sometimes to further encompass the Balleny Islands, a group of sub-Antarctic islands technically considered a part of the Ross Dependency and covered by the Antarctic Treaty.

The five island groups of the New Zealand Subantarctic Islands, including their territorial seas, are a World Heritage Site.

== Island groups ==
The nine island groups classed as part of New Zealand's outlying islands are:

Map	Island group (other names)	Location	Coordinates	Area	Highest peak Altitude	Notes
	Antipodes Islands (Moutere Mahue)	New Zealand Subantarctic Islands, 860 kilometres (530 mi) east-southeast of Stewart Island / Rakiura	49°41′S 178°48′E	21 square kilometres (8.1 sq mi)	Mount Galloway; 366 m (1,201 ft)	Part of the New Zealand Subantarctic Islands World Heritage Site
	Auckland Islands (Motu Maha, Maungahuka)	New Zealand Subantarctic Islands, 360 kilometres (220 mi) south-southwest of Stewart Island / Rakiura	50°42′S 166°05′E	625.64 square kilometres (241.56 sq mi)	Mount Dick; 705 m (2,313 ft)	Site of the most southerly known Polynesian settlement on Enderby Island. Part of the New Zealand Subantarctic Islands World Heritage Site.
	Bounty Islands (Moutere Hauriri)	New Zealand Subantarctic Islands, roughly 670 km (416 mi) east-south-east of New Zealand's South Island and 530 km (329 mi) south-west of the Chatham Islands	47°46′S 179°02′E	1.35 square kilometres (0.52 sq mi)	Unnamed point on Funnel Island; 73 m (240 ft)	Part of the New Zealand Subantarctic Islands World Heritage Site
	Campbell Islands (Motu Ihupuku)	New Zealand Subantarctic Islands, 620 kilometres (390 mi) SSW of Stewart Island / Rakiura	52°32′S 169°09′E	113.31 square kilometres (43.75 sq mi)	Mount Honey; 558 m (1,831 ft)	Part of the New Zealand Subantarctic Islands World Heritage Site
	Chatham Islands (Rēkohu, Wharekauri)	South Pacific Ocean, roughly 800 kilometres (500 mi) east of New Zealand's South Island	43°54′S 176°32′W	966 square kilometres (373 sq mi)	Unnamed point on Chatham Island; 299 m (981 ft)	Largest outlying island group, and the only one with a permanent population (620 as of June 2025).
	Kermadec Islands (Rangitāhua)	South Pacific Ocean, roughly 800–1,000 kilometres (500–620 mi) north of New Zealand's North Island	29°16′S 177°55′W	33.6 square kilometres (13.0 sq mi)	Moumoukai Peak; 516 m (1,693 ft)	Northernmost outlying island group, consisting of a range of volcanic islands which are part of the wider Tonga-Kermadec Ridge. Despite having no permanent population, a meteorological station on Raoul Island is permanently staffed.
	Manawatāwhi / Three Kings Islands (Ngā Motu Karaka)	Convergence of the Tasman Sea and the South Pacific Ocean, roughly 55 kilometres (34 mi) northwest of Cape Reinga / Te Rerenga Wairua	34°09′S 172°08′E	6.85 square kilometres (2.64 sq mi)	Unnamed point on Manawatāwhi / Great Island; 295 m (968 ft)	The islands are on a submarine plateau, the Three Kings Bank, and are separated from the New Zealand mainland by an 8 km wide, 200 to 300 m deep submarine trough
	Snares Islands / Tini Heke (Te Taniwha)	New Zealand Subantarctic Islands, 200 kilometres (120 mi) south of New Zealand's South Island	48°01′S 166°32′E	3.5 square kilometres (1.4 sq mi)	Unnamed point on North East Island; 130 m (430 ft)	Part of the New Zealand Subantarctic Islands World Heritage Site. Given a dual name with the Ngāi Tahu Claims Settlement Act 1998.
	Solander Islands / Hautere	West of the Foveaux Strait, roughly 50 kilometres (31 mi) south of Fiordland on New Zealand's South Island	46°34′S 166°53′E	1.2 square kilometres (0.46 sq mi)	Unnamed point on Solander Island / Hautere; 330 m (1,080 ft)	Only outlying island group to fall within the authority of a regional council, in this case Environment Southland. Given a dual name with the Ngāi Tahu Claims Settlement Act 1998.

== Population ==
The islands are all uninhabited except the Chatham Islands.

There is a staffed meteorological station on Raoul Island of the Kermadec Islands. The meteorological station on Campbell Island has been unstaffed and automated since 1995. There was a meteorological station on the Auckland Islands from 1942 to 1945. The Three Kings Islands and the Auckland Islands were formerly inhabited. There have been failed settlement attempts on Raoul Island, the Antipodes Islands and the Auckland Islands. The Solander Islands have never been inhabited except by shipwrecked sailors or marooned stowaways (for the longest period, from 1808 to 1813 by five European stowaways).

== See also ==
- List of Antarctic and subantarctic islands
- List of islands of New Zealand
- New Zealand Subantarctic Islands
- Macquarie University, an Australian island, but part of the same bioregion as the New Zealand Subantarctic Islands.
- Outlying Islands, Hong Kong
- United States Minor Outlying Islands
