= Hooker River =

River in New Zealand

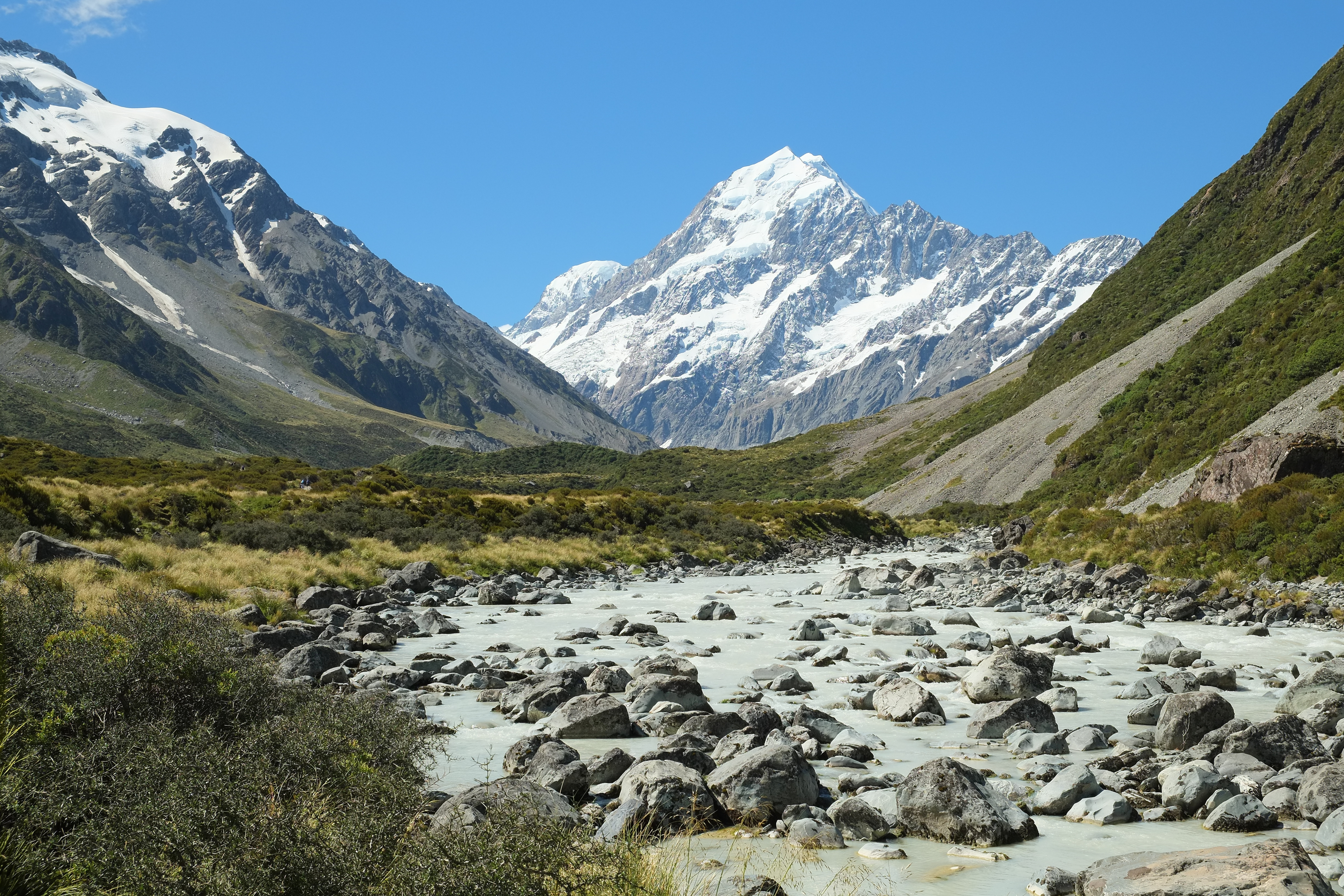
- Hooker River in front of Aoraki / Mount Cook
- Route of the Hooker River
- Mouth of the Hooker River Hooker River (South Island)

Location
- Country: New Zealand

Physical characteristics
- Source
  - location: Hooker Glacier
  - coordinates: 43°41′18″S 170°06′00″E
  - elevation: 877 m (2,877 ft)
- Mouth
  - location: Tasman River
  - coordinates: 43°45′08″S 170°09′10″E
  - elevation: 655 m (2,149 ft)
- Length: 10 km (6.2 mi)

Basin features
- Progression: Hooker River → Tasman River → Lake Pukaki → Pukaki River → Tekapo River → Lake Benmore → Lake Aviemore → Lake Waitaki → Waitaki River → Pacific Ocean
- Bridges: Upper Hooker Suspension Bridge, Hooker Bluff Suspension Bridge, Lower Hooker Suspension Bridge, Tasman Valley Road truss bridge

The Hooker River is a river in Aoraki / Mount Cook National Park in the Southern Alps of New Zealand. It flows south from Hooker Lake, the glacier lake of Hooker Glacier, which lies on the southern slopes of Aoraki / Mount Cook. After 3 kilometers, it flows through Mueller Glacier Lake, gathering more glacial water, before joining the braided streams of the Tasman River, also an outflow of a glacier lake.

== Etymology ==
The geographic Hooker items were named by the Canterbury provincial geologist, Julius von Haast, after the English botanist William Jackson Hooker.

== Description ==
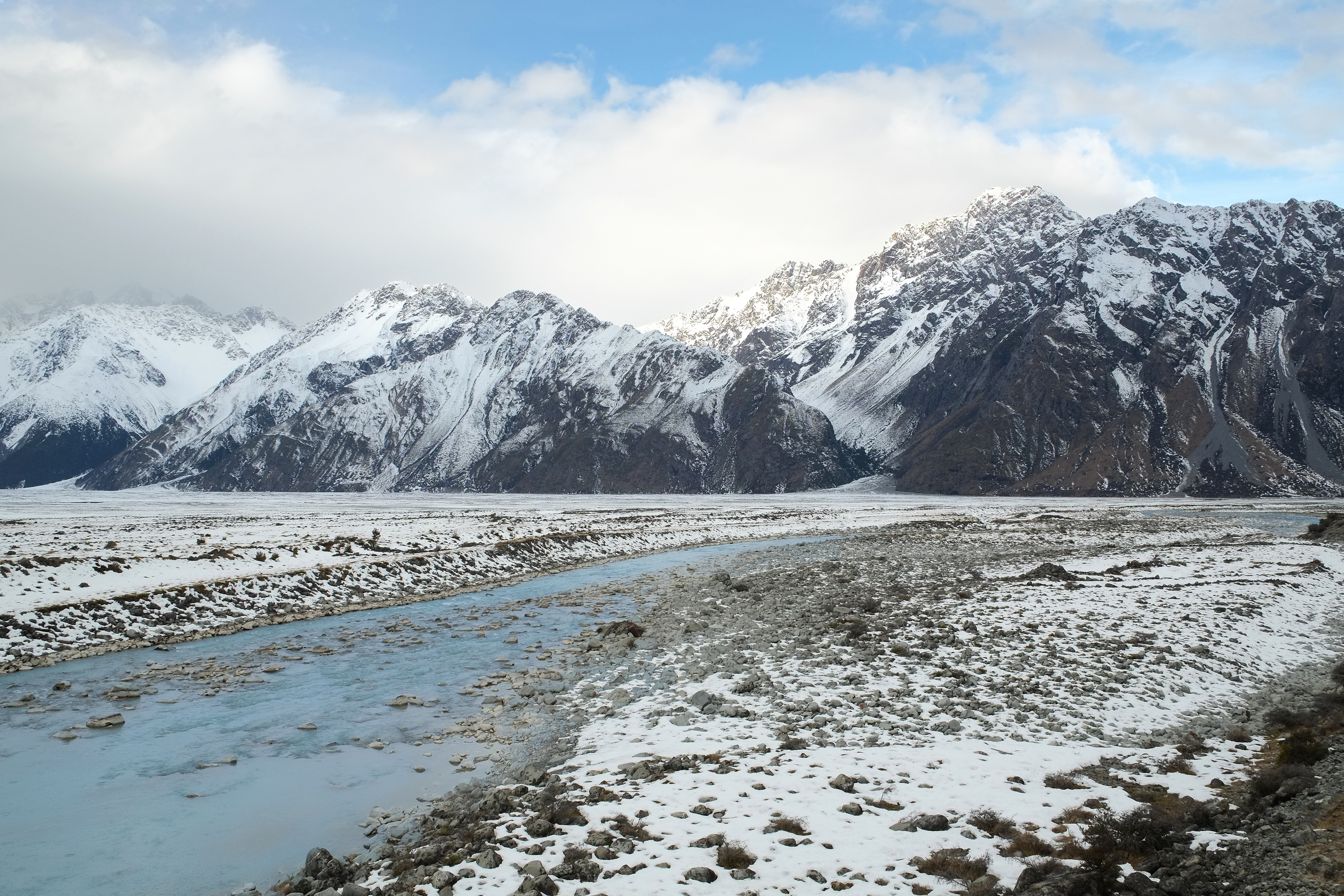
Hooker River entering Tasman Valley in winter just before joining Tasman River

The Hooker River drains both the Hooker and Mueller Glaciers and is the principal ablation outlet for these ice masses. Its water is a milky bluish light grey due to the suspended glacial rock flour in the water. Hooker River along transports 20,000 m^{3} (710,000 cu ft) of sediment per year.

The majority of the Hooker River is within the Aoraki / Mount Cook National Park, as far southeast as the Tasman Valley Road truss bridge. It flows through the flat Hooker Valley, the main tourism area of the park. The river is bridged three times by the pedestrian suspension bridges along the Hooker Valley Track, the most popular walking track in the area. A further track leads further downstream along the river to Tasman Valley Road, which crosses Hooker River on a small one lane road bridge just as the river enters the Tasman Valley.

== See also ==
- List of rivers of New Zealand
