= Richard Agnew =

Australian mountaineer and aviator (born 1959)

Personal information
- Nationality: Australian
- Born: November 1959 (age 66–67)

Climbing career
- Type of climber: Alpine Mountaineer
- Major ascents: Mount Everest, Mount Fitzroy, Manaslu, K2, Aconcagua, Eiger, Matterhorn, Alpamayo, Kilimanjaro, Vinson.
- Known for: Oldest Australian & 1st Canberran to complete Seven Summits

Richard (Rick) Agnew, born 1959, is an Australian alpine mountaineer and high altitude sports aviator who has completed the Seven Summits (climbing the highest mountains on each of the seven continents) climbing Mount Everest and many other peaks. He holds over 40 International and Australian speed, distance and height aviation records. He is also an accomplished sailor.

== Education ==
Agnew is a graduate of the Australian National University, obtaining a BSc(Forestry) in between bushwalking and learning to fly gliders. He undertook officer and pilot training with the Royal Australian Air Force (RAAF), is a graduate of the Australian Defence Force Academy (Masters in Defense Studies), and University of Canberra (Master's in Public Administration and a Doctorate in risk management). Agnew holds a post-graduate qualification in aviation medicine from Monash University.

== Mountaineering ==
Agnew is the oldest Australian and first Canberran to have climbed the highest mountains on each of the seven continents in a feat known as the Seven Summits.

Agnew's interest in climbing was prompted by the climbing activities of his oldest brother, Brian Agnew, who was instrumental in forming the Australian Army Alpine Association (AAA) who led, co-led and/or participated in climbing expeditions throughout the 1980-90s, primarily in the Himalayas, including the Australian Bicentennial Everest Expedition. Other AAA members also included Pat Cullinan SC, OAM, Jon Muir OAM and Zac Zaharias CSM.

Agnew has been climbing seriously since 2000 and has climbed, guided and/or co-guided on all seven continents. Expeditions include climbs in New Zealand and throughout South America, including the technically demanding Mount Fitzroy 3,405 m (11,171 ft), Patagonia, Argentina, volcanos in Ecuador and many peaks in Argentina, Chile, Peru and throughout the European Alps, prior to climbing in the Himalayas.

On an expedition to Aconcagua 6,961 m (22,838 ft), Argentina in 2007, Agnew was part of a team led by Jon Muir when it became apparent that Muir had succumbed to altitude sickness and couldn't continue to guide the team. At high camp, the famed Viento Blanco (white wind) caused all climbing teams at height to attempt an evacuation. One of Agnew's fellow team members experienced life-threatening High-Altitude Pulmonary Edema (HAPE), needing immediate evacuation down the mountain and subsequently airlifted to Mendoza hospital. Agnew was left to lead the remaining team member's survival throughout a deadly night (including a tent fire and a death close by) at high camp. The retreat down the mountain the next day was memorable to Aconcagua's base camp which was also devastated and many teams lost the majority of their equipment.

After many successful summits throughout the world (North and South America, the Andes and in the Alps), Agnew was one of six Australians and two Britons who made it to the summit of Mount Everest on 25 May 2010, with an expedition led by South Australian Duncan Chessell. Agnew finished the last of the Seven Summits with Mount Vinson, Antarctica in December 2014, becoming the first Canberran and oldest Australian to do so.

Agnew's climbing continues with a successful speed ascent of the technical Ama Dablam 6,812 m (22,349 ft) in Nov 2015, climbing back up from the precarious Camp 2 to rescue a young Australian; and an attempt on Shishapangma 8,027 m (26,335 ft) in May 2016 and a successful ascent on the eighth highest mountain in the world Mt Manaslu, 8,163 m (26,781 ft), Agnew being the oldest Australian to do so in Sept 2018. A massive avalanche stopped Agnew from a successful summit of the world's second highest mountain, K2 8,611 m (28,251 ft) in Pakistan. On 17 July 2019 Agnew on the Abruzzi route was halted at the end of the famous Bottleneck's narrow couloir, reaching 8,350 m of K2's 8,611 m altitude.

In July 2022, Agnew was again thwarted in his 2nd attempt to summit K2 with two of his team of six dying in independent accidents on the mountain. Summiting was possible but for the search and rescue and subsequent body retrieval and on-mountain burials. Agnew reached 7,800 m of the 8,611 m this time.

In March 2025, Agnew summited Carstensz Pyramid (Puncak Jaya) in Irian Jaya (West Papua, now Indonesia) thereby achieving both the Ball and Messner seven summit list and becoming the oldest Australian to date to do so.

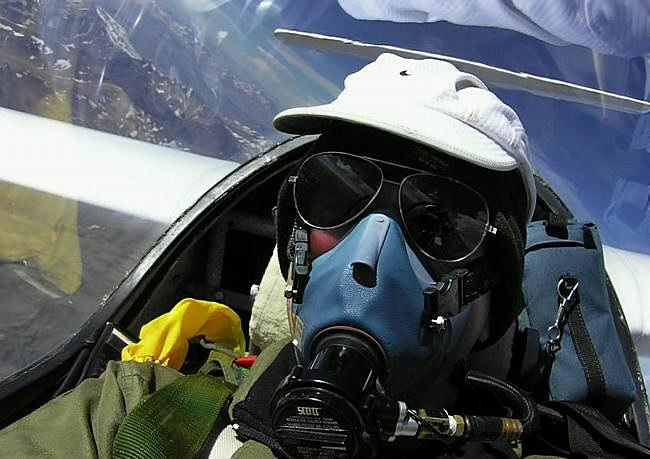
Richard Agnew, Aviator

== Gliding ==
Agnew trained with several Australian gliding clubs, soloing with the Canberra Gliding Club prior to his officer and pilot training with the Royal Australian Air Force. Agnew is a three diamond badged pilot (Dec 1992) who has achieved the Australian altitude record in a glider when he reached 10,000 m (33,000 ft) in 1995. He achieved his 1,000 km Fédération Aéronautique Internationale (FAI) & diploma on 25 Nov 2005.

Agnew is the winner of the Gliding Federation of Australia's annual Martin Warner Trophy, for highest height gain, winning 17 times in the last twenty years. Agnew has over 40 International and Australian speed, distance and height records.

== Sailing ==
Agnew is an experienced sailor, starting at an early age leading to competitive dingy sailing in Mirror, Manly Junior, Laser, Moths, NS14s, Flying 15s and onto Olympic trials in 470s in 2003 on Port Phillip Bay for the Athens Olympics 2004.

Agnew then went on to transition into offshore racing and long distance passages including:

- Several Rolex Sydney to Hobart Yacht Races and lead-up races in 2020; 21 and 23 (2020 was cancelled).
- As a crew member (grinder/trimmer), Rick, on the Swan 65 ‘Eve’ won the Bird Island Race in ORC2, IRC2 and PHS 2021. Again crewing on Eve, coming first in PHS during the Cabbage Tree Island Race and took the overall win in Division 1, for the ‘Sydney to Hobart Classic Yacht Regatta’ 2021. Later Eve came 4th in her division and crossed the line 21st overall in the 2021 Rolex Sydney Hobart Yacht Race.
- In 2022, Agnew, as part of a small delivery/re-fit crew, sailed the Southern South Atlantic / Southern Ocean from Ushuaia, Argentina, down the Beagle Channel through the Southern Ocean and eventually up to the Falkland Islands, onward to Uruguay, and finally to Brazil for the yacht’s re-fit. The voyage was not without its moments - including gear box breakages, keel problems and serious flooding episodes.
- Again crewing on ‘Eve’, Agnew competed in the Atlantic and English 2023 yacht racing season - La Trinite – Cowes 2023; Cowes – St Marlo 2023; Cowes Week 2023.
- Agnew, on ‘Eve’, competed in the 50th Rolex Fastnet Race 2023. The 2023 Rolex Fastnet Race saw a record-breaking entry of 494 yachts, making it the largest offshore yacht race ever held. Of those, 430 boats were officially entered, 424 started, and 258 finished the gruelling 695-nautical-mile course from Cowes, UK to Cherbourg-en-Cotentin, France. The Fastnet is known as the ‘Everest’ of sailing. The race’s opening was brutal with winds gusting to 40+ knots (Force 9), and seas climbing to 5–6 m.
- In 2023, Agnew crewed on a Sparkman & Stephens 39 ‘Millennium Falcon’ in the lead-up races and in the 2023 Rolex Sydney to Hobart Yacht Race.
- Again crewing on ‘Eve’, Agnew participated in the lead-up and the Rolex Middle Sea Race 2024.
- In 2025, Agnew successfully navigated and crewed on the S&S 39, ‘Millennium Falcon’, finishing the Rolex Sydney to Hobart Yacht Race where over a quarter of the fleet withdrew due to issues caused from rough sea conditions, large waves, and sea sickness.
