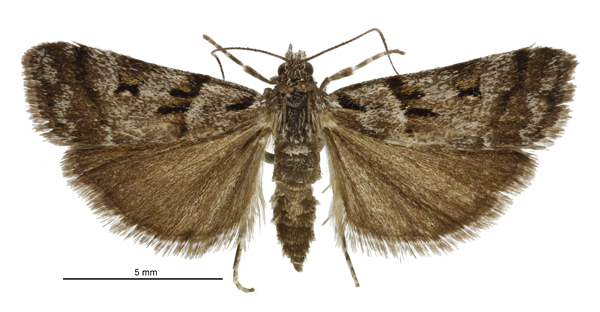
- Male
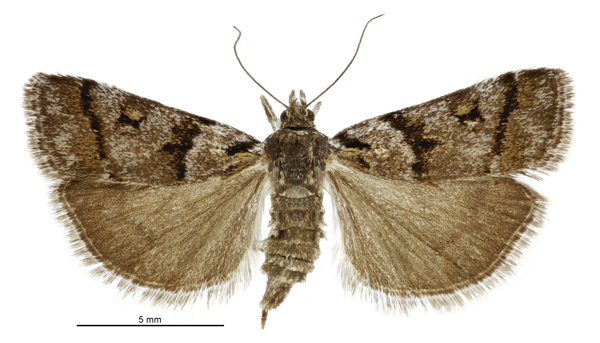
- Female

Conservation status
- Nationally Vulnerable (NZ TCS)

Scientific classification
- Kingdom: Animalia
- Phylum: Arthropoda
- Clade: Pancrustacea
- Class: Insecta
- Order: Lepidoptera
- Family: Crambidae
- Genus: Eudonia
- Species: E. organaea

Binomial name
- Eudonia organaea (Meyrick, 1901)

Synonyms
- Scoparia organaea Meyrick, 1901

= Eudonia organaea =

Species of moth endemic to New Zealand

Eudonia organaea is a moth in the family Crambidae. It was first described by Edward Meyrick in 1901. It is endemic to New Zealand and can be found on the south eastern parts of the South Island. It frequents short-turf grassland and wetland habitats and has been observed in glacial moraines. Adults are on the wing from November until February and are attracted to light. The larvae likely feed on mosses. In 2025 this species was classified as nationally vulnerable by the Department of Conservation as it is biologically sparse, is impacted by climate change, is data poor, is range restricted and is relict. It is retreating even from suitable habitat.

== Taxonomy ==
This species was first described by Edward Meyrick in 1901 and originally named Scoparia organaea. George Hudson discussed and illustrated this species under that name in his 1928 book The butterflies and moths of New Zealand. In 1988 John S. Dugdale placed this species in the genus Eudonia. The male lectotype, collected by Hudson at Mount Cook, is held at the Natural History Museum, London.

== Description ==
Illustration by Hudson.

Live moth at rest.

Meyrick originally described the male of this species as follows:

♂. 16-17 m.m. Head and thorax blackish or dark fuscous, somewhat mixed with whitish. Palpi 2, fuscous mixed with black and white, towards base beneath white. Antennal ciliations 1/3. Forewings elongate, posteriorly dilated, apex obtuse, termen almost straight, little oblique, rounded beneath ; dark fuscous, irregularly irrorated with whitish ; an oblique black subbasal streak from costa to submedian fold, white-edged anteriorly ; a black suffusion above some ochreous scales on dorsum near base ; first and second lines rather thick, black, first anteriorly whitish-edged, oblique, nearly straight, very slightly bent below middle, second posteriorly whitish-edged at extremities, almost straight, very slightly curved near costa ; orbicular and claviform small, black, connected with first line ; discal mark X-shaped, more or less imperfect, black, upper part more or less filled with brownish-ochreous, and lower with white ; these spots and lines sometimes partially mixed with brownish-ochreous scales; subterminal line barely indicated by a few whitish scales, presubterminal space sometimes sprinkled with brownish-ochreous : cilia fuscous, mixed with whitish, with dark fuscous subbasal line, tips whitish. Hindwings 1 1/4, dark fuscous, rather lighter towards base; cilia as in forewings.

== Distribution ==
This species is endemic to New Zealand. This species occurs on the south eastern areas of the South Island.

== Habitat and hosts ==
This species inhabits short-turf grassland and wetland habitats and has been observed in glacial moraines in the southern parts of the South Island. The larvae of this species are likely to feed on mosses.

== Behaviour ==
Adults are on the wing from November until February and are attracted to light.

== Conservation status ==
In 2025 this species was classified by the New Zealand Department of Conservation as nationally vulnerable under the New Zealand Threat Classification System. E. organaea obtained this classification as it is biologically sparse, is impacted by climate change, has a lack of data on both the population size as well as how the population is changing over time, is range restricted and is relict. The classification report states that this species has "retreated even from apparently suitable habitat".
