= Hooker Glacier (New Zealand) =

Glacier in New Zealand

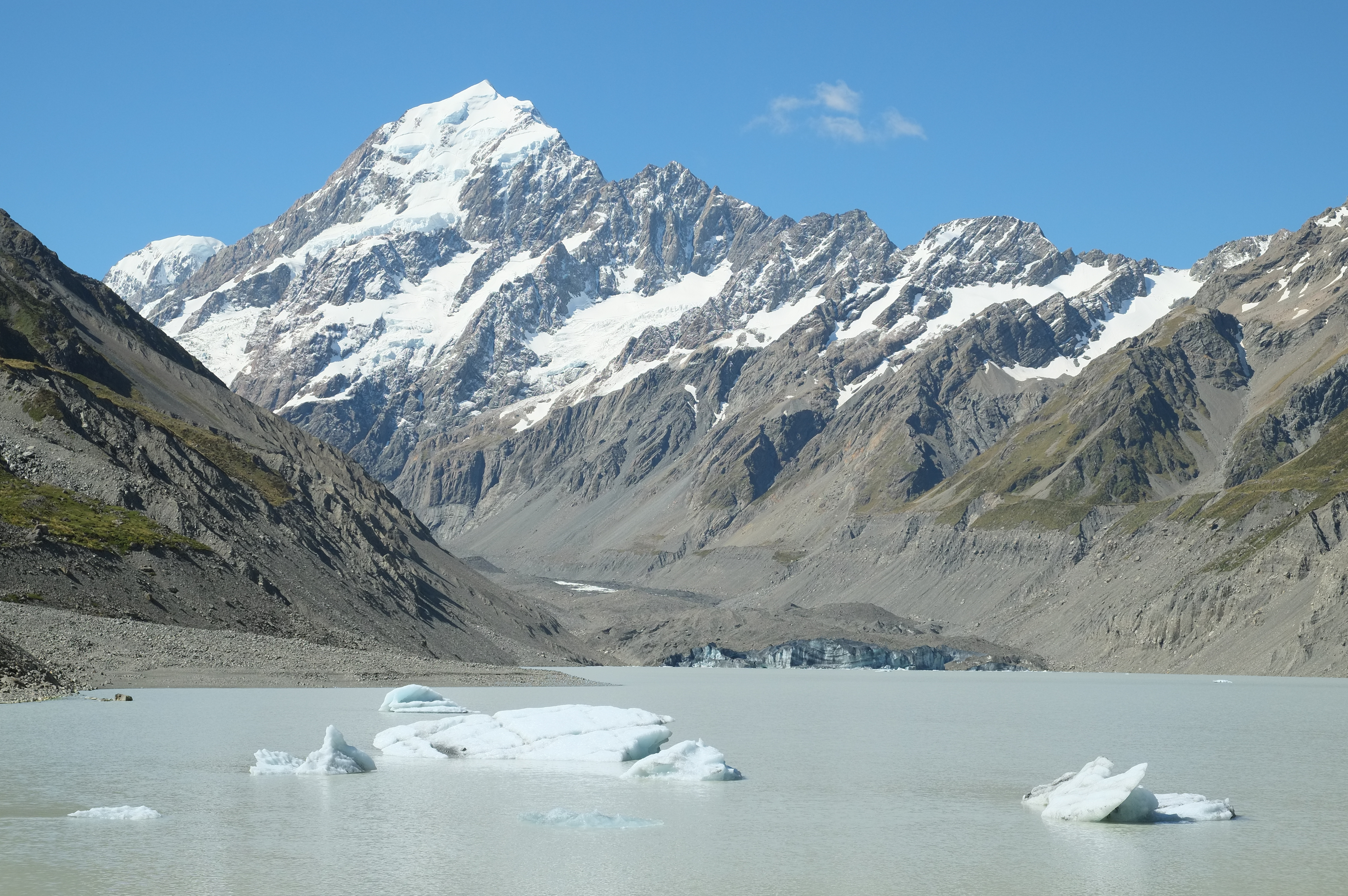
- View across glacier lake to Hooker Glacier terminus in front of Aoraki / Mount Cook
- Interactive map of Hooker Glacier
- Type: Mountain glacier
- Location: New Zealand
- Coordinates: 43°40′0″S 170°7′0″E
- Length: 11 km (6.8 mi)
- Thickness: 150 m (490 ft)
- Terminus: Hooker Lake
- Status: Retreating

Hooker Glacier is one of several glaciers close to the slopes of Aoraki / Mount Cook in the Southern Alps of New Zealand. It is not as large as its neighbour, the Tasman Glacier, measuring 11 kilometres (roughly 6–7 miles) in length.

== Etymology ==
The geographic Hooker items were named by the Canterbury provincial geologist, Julius von Haast, after the English botanist William Jackson Hooker.

== Description ==
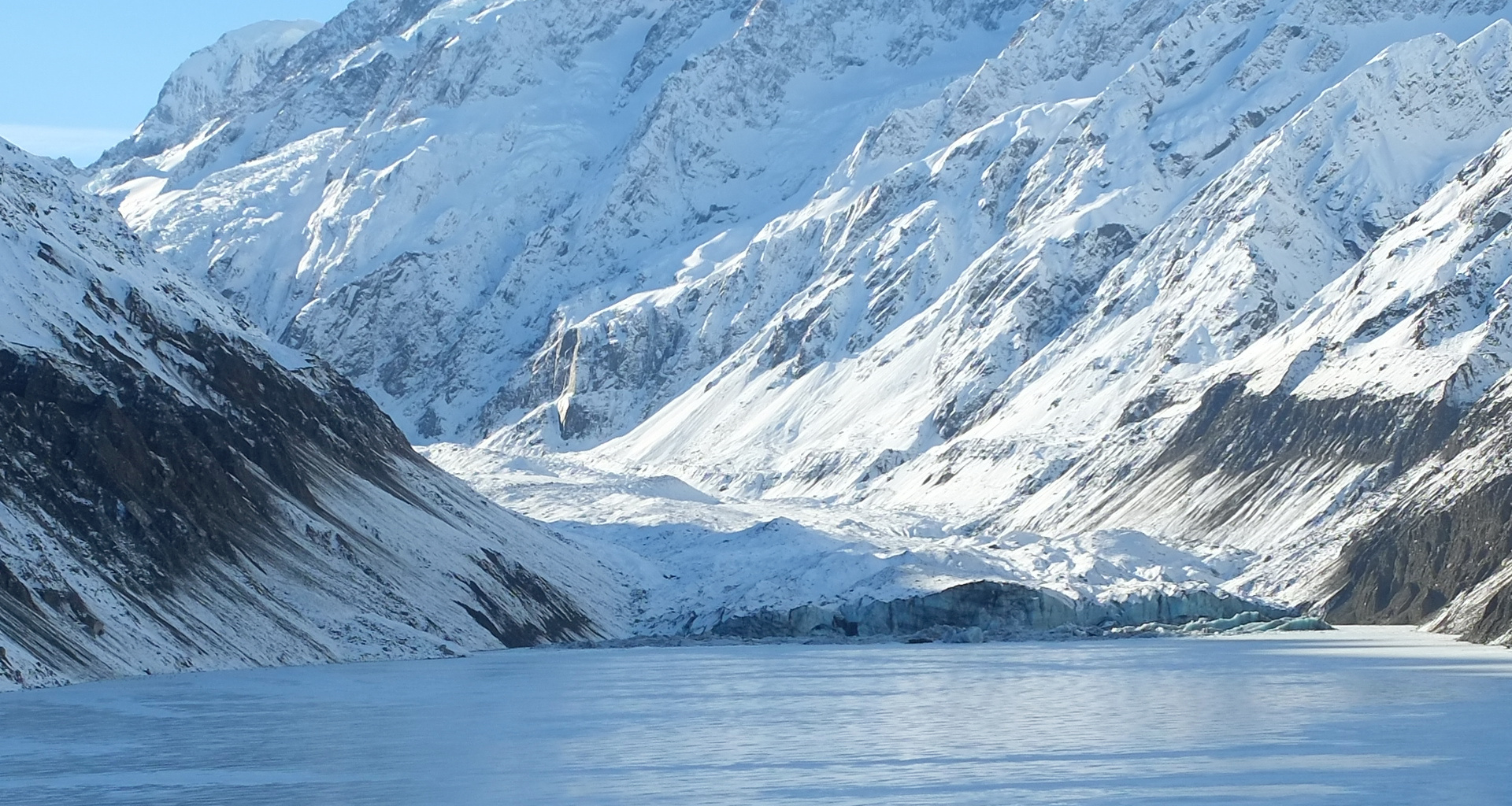
Hooker Glacier in winter, behind frozen Hooker Lake

The glacier starts on the south-western slopes of Aoraki / Mount Cook, with its tributaries Sheila Glacier, Empress Glacier, and Noeline Glacier. Hooker Glacier runs south from there until its terminus at Hooker Lake. The glacial water from the lake is the source of the Hooker River, a small tributary of the Tasman River, which flows into Lake Pukaki.

One of New Zealand's more accessible glaciers, the glacier and its terminus can be seen clearly from the end of the Hooker Valley Track. This easy walk to the glacier lake is the most popular in the region.

For serious trampers and mountaineers, there are three huts along the glacier further up the valley: Hooker Hut, Gardiner Hut, and Empress Hut.

The current glacier lake only started to form in the 1970s, left behind as Hooker Glacier retreated. Like many of the glaciers in the Southern Alps, Hooker Glacier is rapidly melting, with the glacier lake projected to grow as the terminus retreats until it reaches the glacier bed about 4 kilometres upstream from the current terminus.

== See also ==
- Glaciers of New Zealand
- Hooker River
