= Hooker Lake =

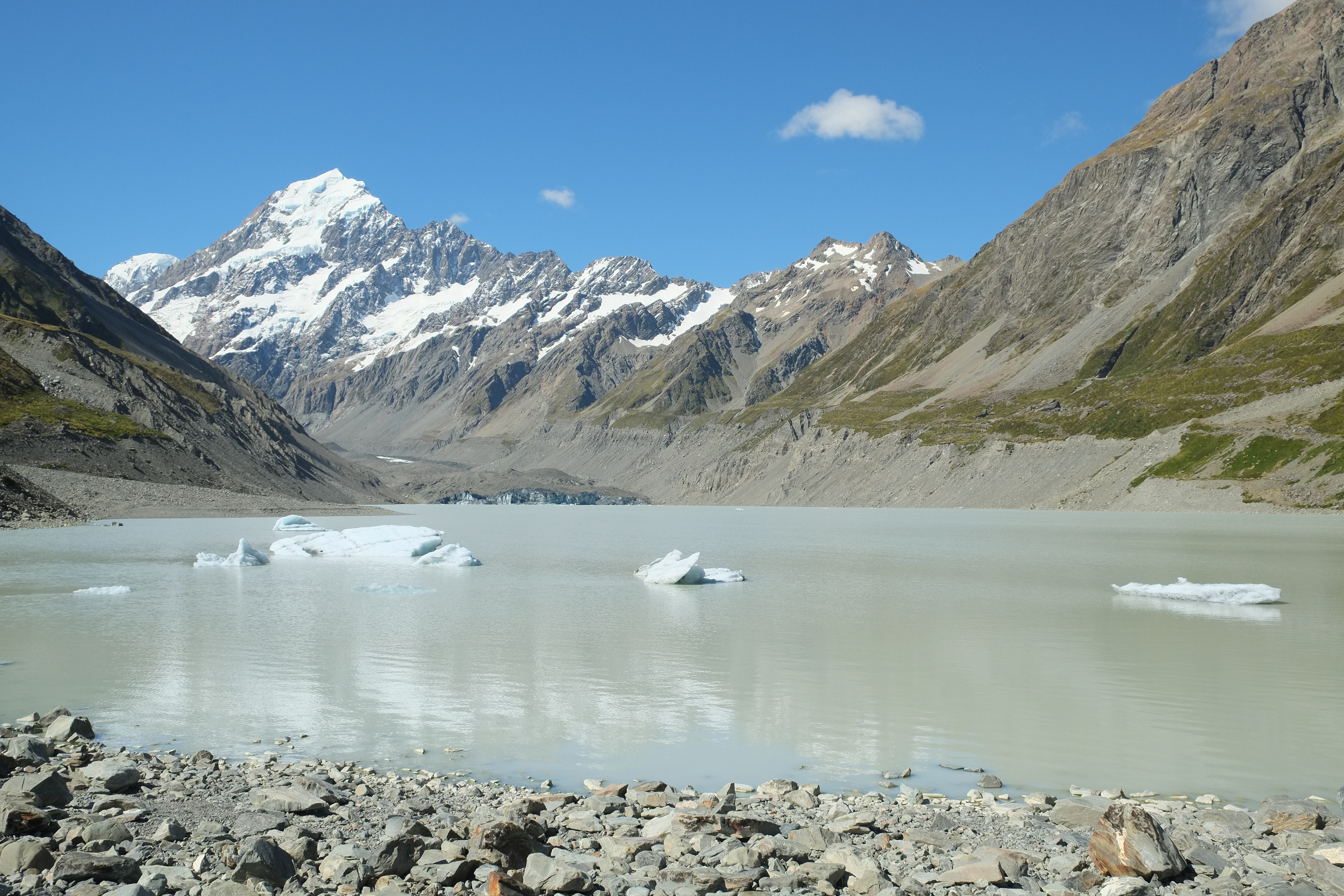
- Hooker Glacier Lake in front of Aoraki / Mount Cook in summer

- Location within South Island
- Location: Mount Cook National Park, South Island
- Coordinates: 43°40′45″S 170°06′30″E
- Type: Proglacial lake
- Primary outflows: Hooker River
- Basin countries: New Zealand
- Max. length: 2.5 kilometres (1.6 mi) (2016)
- Max. width: 0.5 kilometres (0.31 mi)
- Max. depth: 136 metres (446 ft)
- Surface elevation: 877 metres (2,877 ft)
- Frozen: most winters

Hooker Lake is a proglacial lake that started to form in the late 1970s by the recent retreat of the Hooker Glacier. It is in the Hooker Valley, in the Aoraki / Mount Cook National Park in New Zealand's South Island, just south of Aoraki / Mount Cook.

== Etymology ==
The geographic Hooker items were named by the Canterbury provincial geologist, Julius von Haast, after British botanist William Jackson Hooker.

== Description ==
Hooker Lake's length has doubled between 1990 and 2013 from 1.2 kilometres to 2.3 kilometres, the glacier retreating by over 50 metres (160 ft) per year. It is expected to grow by another 4 kilometres (2.5 mi) as Hooker Glacier retreats further up the valley until the glacier's retreat will have reached the point where the glacier bed is higher than the lake's water level.

The lake is one of the most accessible glacier lakes and can be reached year-round from the White Horse Hill camp ground near Mount Cook Village via the well-formed Hooker Valley Track. The track ends at a lookout point at the lake's shore, with a short path providing easy access to the shore.

In the warmer months icebergs can typically be seen floating in the water. The icebergs slowly drift from the terminus of the glacier at the northern end of the lake until close to the shore. The lake's water temperature is typically lower than 2 °C (36 °F).

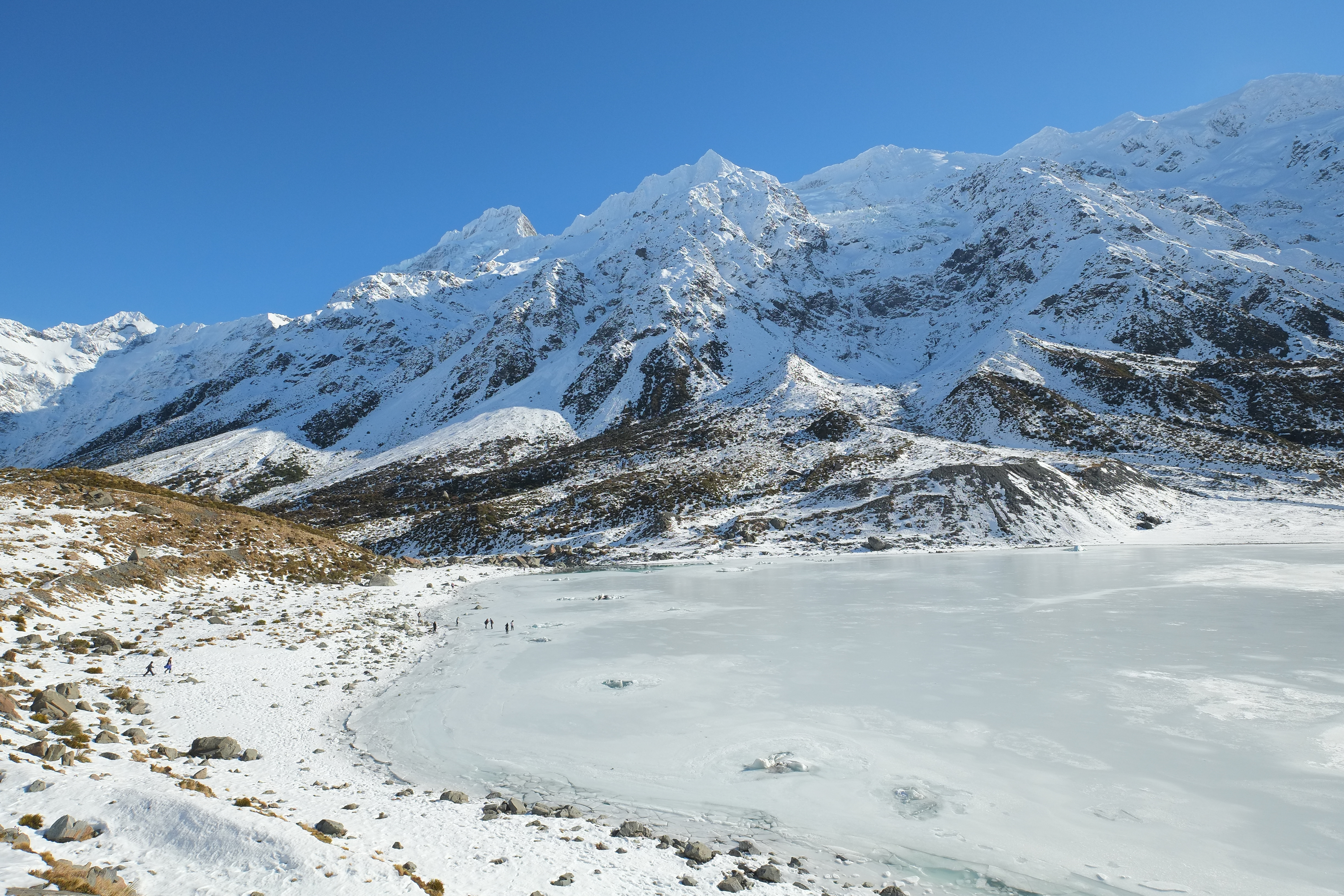
Shore of the frozen lake in winter, with people walking onto the ice

In winter, the lake freezes over.

Hooker Lake drains into Hooker River, its glacial waters blueish light grey due to the suspended glacial rock flour.

No boats tour the lake, but they do the large, nearby Tasman Lake.

== See also ==
- Climate change in New Zealand
