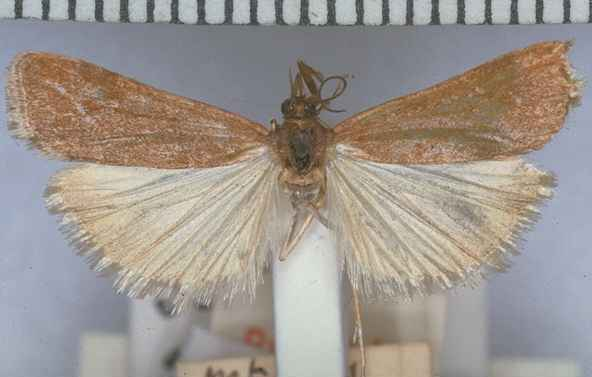
- Male lectotype

Scientific classification
- Kingdom: Animalia
- Phylum: Arthropoda
- Class: Insecta
- Order: Lepidoptera
- Family: Crambidae
- Genus: Eudonia
- Species: E. alopecias

Binomial name
- Eudonia alopecias (Meyrick, 1901)

Synonyms
- Scoparia alopecias Meyrick, 1901

= Eudonia alopecias =

Species of moth

Eudonia alopecias is a moth in the family Crambidae. It was described by Edward Meyrick in 1901. It is endemic to New Zealand and has been found at Aoraki / Mount Cook in February.

== Taxonomy ==
This species was first described by Edward Meyrick in 1901 using specimens collected at Aoraki / Mount Cook in February by R. W. Fereday and named Scoparia alopecias. Hudson discussed this species in his book The butterflies and moths of New Zealand. In 1988 John S. Dugdale placed this species in the genus Eudonia. The male lectotype is held at the Natural History Museum, London.

== Description ==
Meyrick described the species as follows:

♂ 23 m.m., ♀ 18 m.m. Head, palpi, and thorax ferruginous-brown; palpi 2 1/2-3, white towards base beneath. Antennal ciliations of ♂ 1/3. Abdomen brownish. Forewings elongate, gradually dilated, costa nearly straight, slightly sinuate, apex obtuse, termen slightly sinuate, rather oblique; ferruginous-brown, in ♂ sprinkled with white towards termen : cilia greyish-ochreous, with two cloudy ferruginous-brown shades. Hindwings 1 1/4, in ♂ very pale whitish-fuscous, slightly brassy-tinged, termen suffused with fuscous, in ♀ fuscous, becoming darker posteriorly; cilia fuscous-whitish, in ♀ fuscous at base.

== Distribution ==
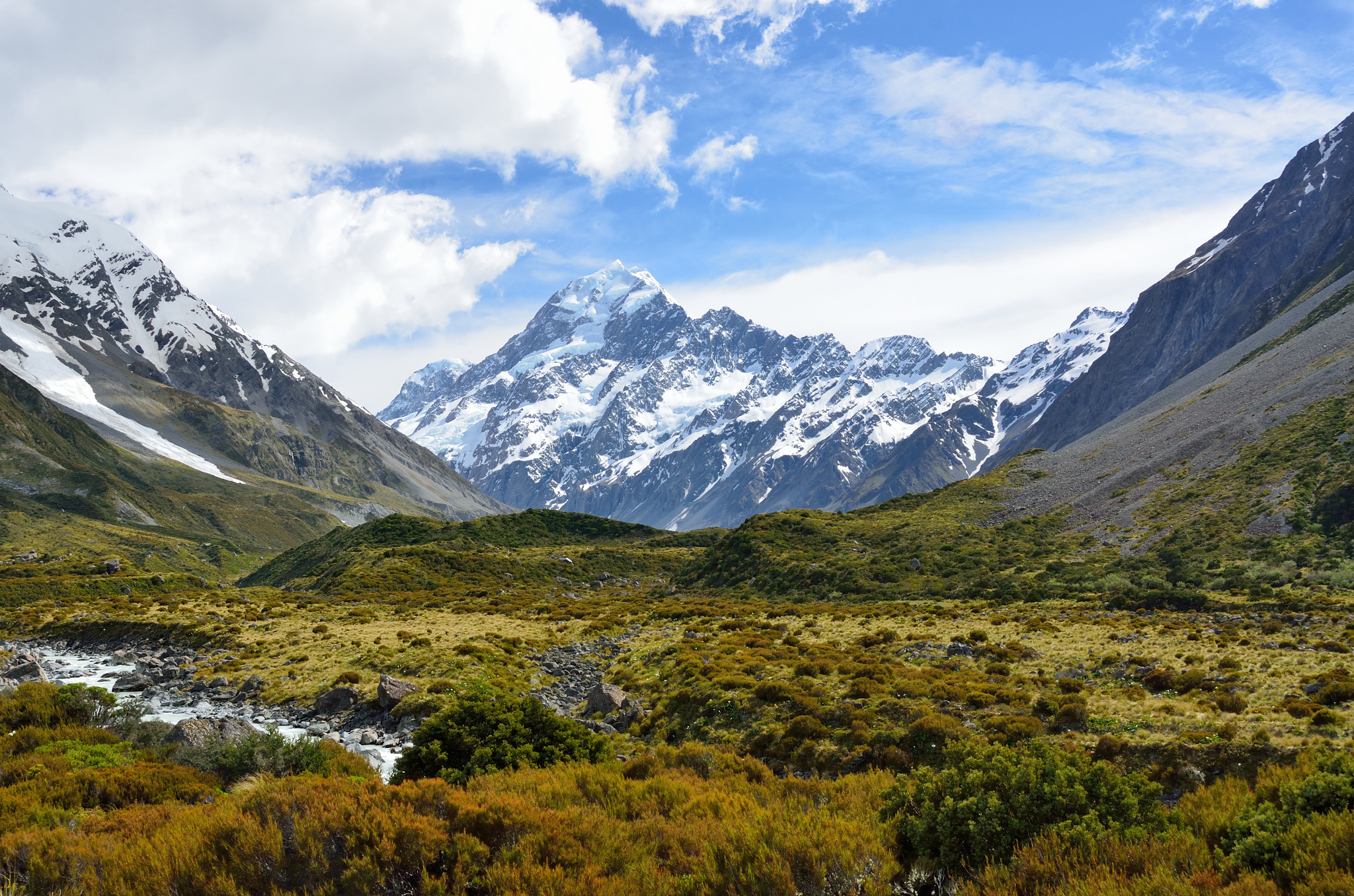
Aoraki Mount Cook, type locality of E. alopecias.

This species is endemic to New Zealand and is found at Mount Cook.

== Behaviour ==
Adults have been recorded on wing in February.
