= Zac Zaharias =

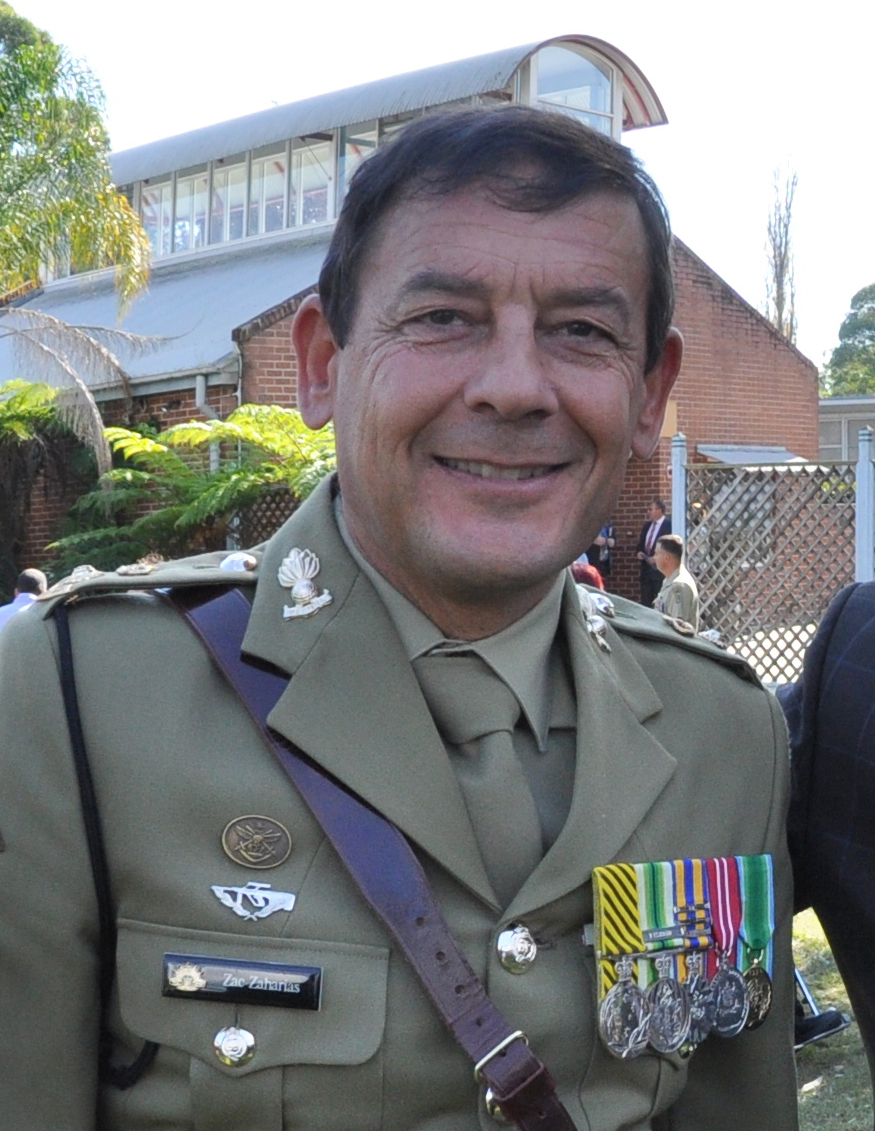
- Lieutenant Colonel Zac Zaharias, retired senior Australian Army officer, veteran Australian mountain climber, adventurer and outdoor trainer.

Personal information
- Nationality: Australian
- Born: 21 July 1956 (age 70)

Climbing career
- Type of climber: Mountaineer
- Major ascents: Mount Everest (2001)

Lieutenant Colonel Zacharakis Zaharias, CSM (born 21 July 1956) is a retired senior Australian Army officer, veteran Australian mountain climber, adventurer and outdoor trainer. Zaharias was part of the Australian Army expedition that climbed Mount Everest in 2010. Zaharias was one of six Australians and two Britons who made it to the summit on 25 May 2010 with an expedition led by South Australian Duncan Chessell. Zaharias is a graduate of the Royal Military College, Duntroon (1974–77) and has served with the Royal Australian Engineers, including appointments as Commanding Officer 5th Combat Engineer Regiment (5CER) and 5th Engineer Regiment (5ER), at the Australian Defence Force Academy, and with the United Nations. Zaharias is the president of the Canberra Climbers Association.

== Expeditions ==
Zaharias is one of Australia's leading high altitude climbers, his first expedition to the Himalayas was in the early 1980s and he was a driving force of the Australian Army Alpine Club for many years. He has participated in 17 major high altitude expeditions and has been leader or deputy leader on 13 of his expeditions. He has summited six of the world’s fourteen peaks above 8000 metres. His notable ascents include:

- 2nd Australian ascent of Denali (6192m) in Alaska in 1982;
- 2nd ascent of the south-east face of Nilgiri North (7061m) in 1983;
- 1st Australian ascents of Broad Peak (8046m) in 1986 and Dhaulagiri I (8167m) in 1997;
- 1st ascent of the north face of Kedarnath (6940m) in 1991 on a joint Indo-Australian Military Expedition; and
- an ascent of Spantik Peak (7028m) in Pakistan in 2011 on an Australian-Pakistan Military Expedition.

On an expedition to Ganesh IV in 1981, Zaharias was with fellow climbers Maila Pemba, David Simpson and Jim Truscott who were left stranded, without equipment and "lucky to be alive" after the avalanche destroyed the camp two killing David Sloane.

In 2001, on the Army Alpine Association expedition, one of the team members and two people accompanying him were killed in an avalanche while they were doing an acclimatisation trek in Nepal several hundred kilometres away from Everest.

== Everest ==
Zaharias became the second Australian Army representative and the oldest Australian to summit Everest on his third attempt in 2010. That record was surpassed in 2012 by Jan Smith when she summited Everest at the age of 68.

Zaharias' first attempt was in 1988 as part of the Australian Bicentennial expedition. Zaharias got to within 300m of the Summit. RAAF Sergeant Brian Laursen and Paul Bain made it to the top. His second attempt was in 2001 when he was the leader of the Army Alpine Association team. In that attempt Lieutenant Colonel Pat Cullinan made the summit on 25 May 2010. Major Zaharias got to within 100m from the summit.

The Defence Newspaper said that "It was third time lucky for Major Zac Zaharias when he eventually made it to the top of the world – conquering Mount Everest – after falling agonisingly short on two earlier attempts. When he got there, though, there was no hooting and hollering, no singing, no dancing – just relief and a deep sense of accomplishment, and a brief moment to take in the breath-taking view before focusing on a safe descent."
