= New Zealand Mountain Guides Association =

The New Zealand Mountain Guides Association (NZMGA) provides training programmes and certification for professional Mountain and Ski Guides in New Zealand.

== History ==
The NZMGA was established in 1974 and joined the IFMGA in 1981. The first professional guide in New Zealand was Ulrich Kaufmann, a Swiss guide, who attempted the first ascent of Aoraki / Mount Cook in 1882.
