= Southern Alps =

Mountain range on the South Island in New Zealand

Southern Alps / Kā Tiritiri o te Moana
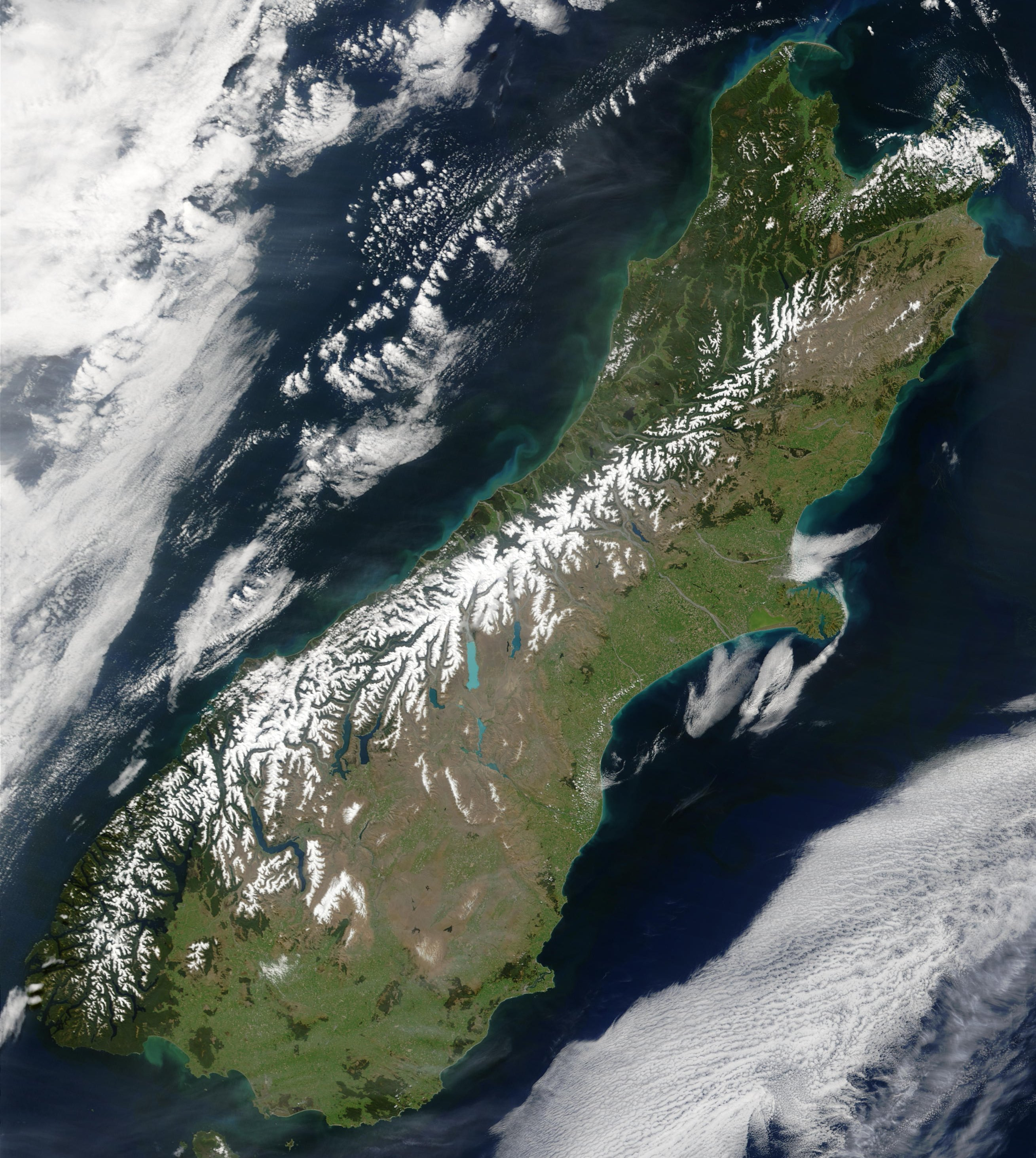
- Snow highlights the mountain range in this satellite image

Highest point
- Peak: Aoraki / Mount Cook
- Elevation: 3,724 m (12,218 ft)
- Coordinates: 43°35′44.69″S 170°8′27.75″E

Dimensions
- Length: 500 km (310 mi)

Geography
- Location: South Island, New Zealand
- Range coordinates: 43°30′S 170°30′E

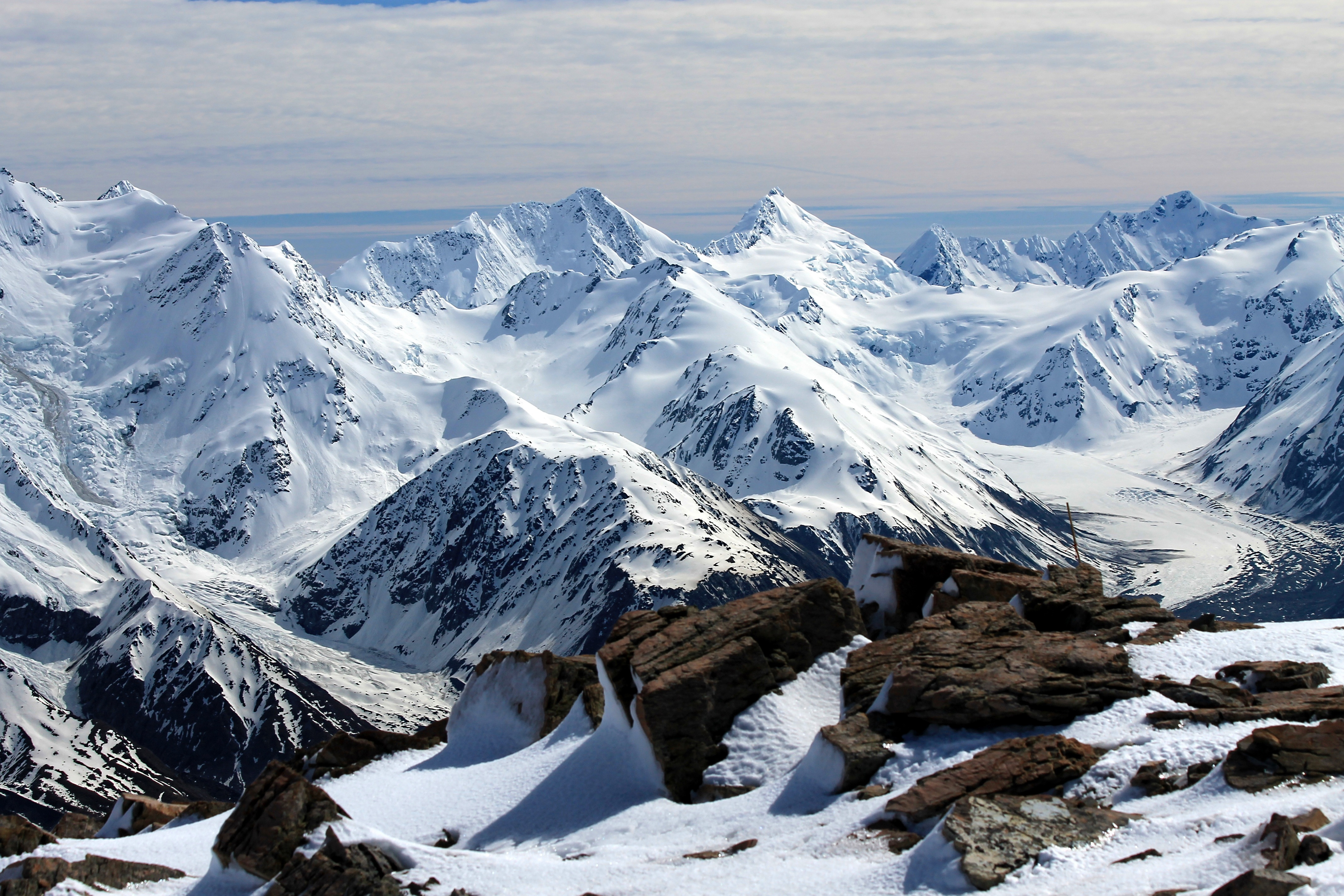
Southern Alps in winter

The Southern Alps (Māori: Kā Tiritiri o te Moana; officially Southern Alps / Kā Tiritiri o te Moana) is a mountain range extending along much of the length of New Zealand's South Island, reaching its greatest elevations near the range's western side. The name "Southern Alps" generally refers to the entire range, although separate names are given to many of the smaller ranges that form part of it.

The range includes the South Island's Main Divide, which separates the water catchments of the more heavily populated eastern side of the island from those on the west coast. Politically, the Main Divide forms the boundary between the Marlborough, Canterbury and Otago regions to the southeast and the Tasman and West Coast regions to the northwest.

== Names ==
The Māori name of the range is Kā Tiritiri o te Moana, meaning "the Mirage of the Ocean": it was told that while Māui sailing his waka along the South Island west coast, one of its passengers spotted a white blot on the horizon presumably snow indicating a mountain range; Māui however dismissed it as a glimmering mirage (tiritiri) on the sea until he was proven wrong later when they moved closer to land.

The English explorer James Cook may have bestowed the name Southern Alps on 23 March 1770. Cook describes Fiordland as being of a "prodigious height" while sailing from Five Fingers Point north east to 44 degrees, 22 minutes south (near today's Milford Sound / Piopiotahi). Cook did not witness Aoraki / Mt Cook as it was "foggy" noting "...we sometimes saw the Summits of the Mountains above the fogg and Clouds, which plainly shew'd that the inland parts were high and Mountainous, and gave me reason to think that there is a Continued Chain of Mountains from the one End of the Island to the other". The Southern Alps had previously been noted by Abel Tasman in 1642, whose description of the South Island's west coast is often translated as "a land uplifted high".

Following the passage of the Ngāi Tahu Claims Settlement Act 1998, the official name of the range was updated to Southern Alps / Kā Tiritiri o te Moana.

== Geography ==
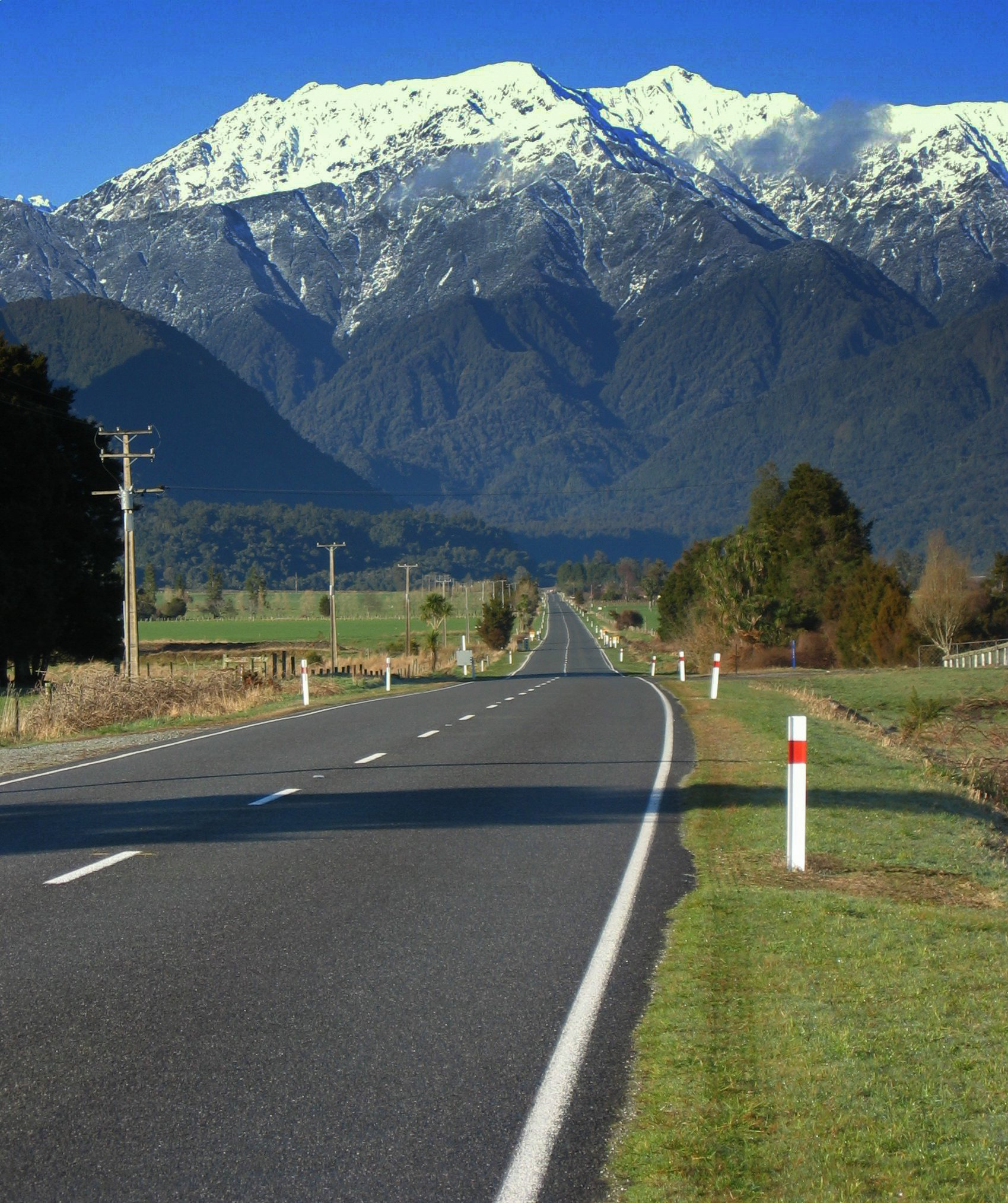
View of the western Southern Alps from State Highway 6 near Hari Hari, Westland

The Southern Alps run approximately 500 km northeast to southwest. The tallest peak is Aoraki / Mount Cook, the highest point in New Zealand at 3,724 metres (12,218 ft). The Southern Alps includes sixteen other points that exceed 3,000 metres (9,800 ft) in height (see NZ mountains by height). The mountain ranges are bisected by glacial valleys, many of which are infilled with glacial lakes on the eastern side including Lake Coleridge in the north and Lake Wakatipu in Otago in the south. According to an inventory conducted in the late 1970s, the Southern Alps contained over 3,000 glaciers larger than one hectare, the longest of which – the Tasman Glacier – is 23.5 kilometres (14.6 mi) in length, retreated from a recent maximum of 29 kilometres (18 mi) in the 1960s.

Settlements include Maruia Springs, a spa near Lewis Pass, the town of Arthur's Pass, and Mount Cook Village.

Major crossings of the Southern Alps in the New Zealand road network include Lewis Pass (SH 7), Arthur's Pass (SH 73), Haast Pass (SH 6), and the road to Milford Sound (SH 94).

=== Climate ===
New Zealand has a humid maritime, temperate climate with the Southern Alps lying perpendicular to the prevailing westerly flow of air. Annual precipitation varies greatly across the range, from 3,000 millimetres (120 in) at the West Coast, 15,000 millimetres (590 in) close to the Main Divide, to 1,000 millimetres (39 in) 30 kilometres (19 mi) east of the Main Divide. This high precipitation aids the growth of glaciers above the snow line. Large glaciers and snowfields can be found west of or on the Main Divide, with smaller glaciers farther east (See Glaciers of New Zealand).

Because of its orientation perpendicular to the prevailing westerly winds, the range creates excellent wave soaring conditions for glider pilots. The town of Omarama, in the lee of the mountains, has gained an international reputation for its gliding conditions. The prevailing westerlies also create a weather pattern known as the Nor'west arch, in which moist air is pushed up over the mountains, forming an arch of cloud in an otherwise blue sky. This weather pattern is frequently visible in summer across Canterbury and North Otago. The 'Nor'wester' is a foehn wind similar to the Chinook of Canada, where mountain ranges in the path of prevailing moisture laden winds force air upwards, thus cooling the air and condensing the moisture to rain, producing hot dry winds in the descending air lee of the mountains.

== Geology ==
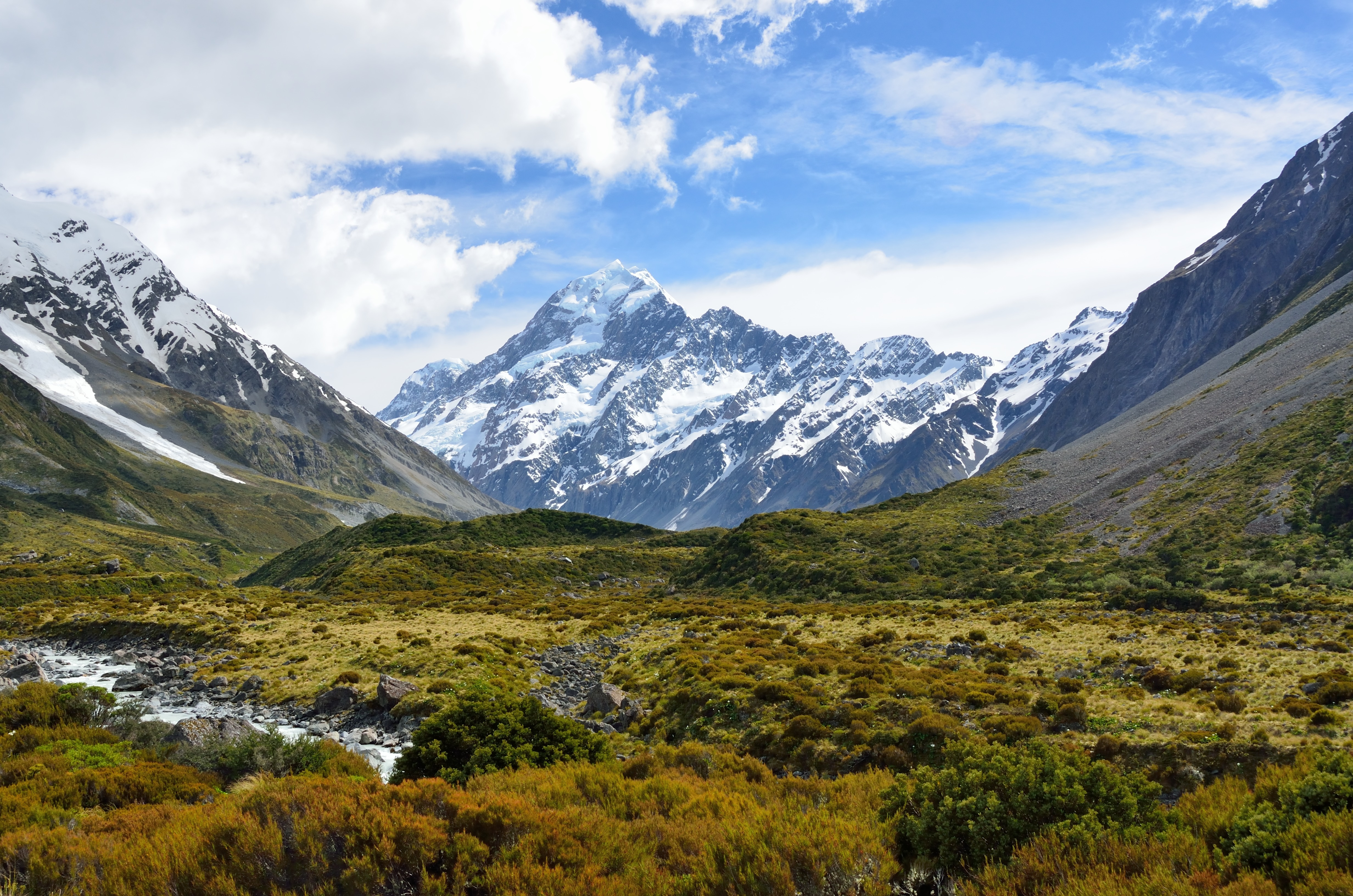
View of Aoraki / Mount Cook, the highest peak, from the Hooker Valley Track

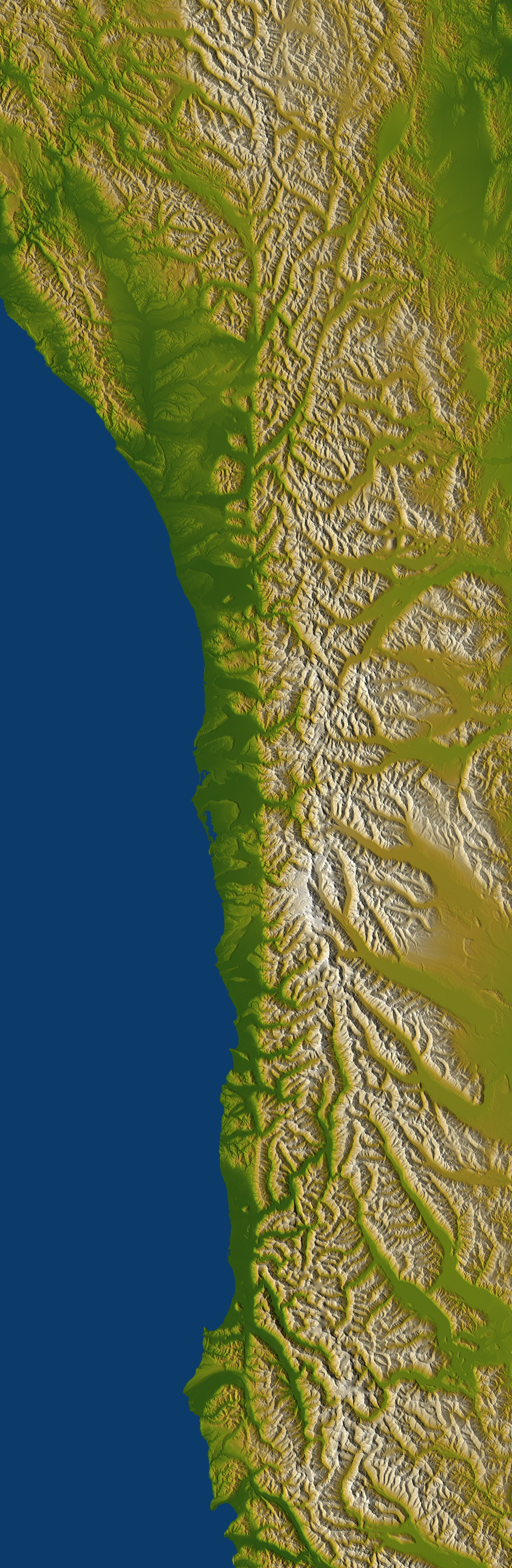
Shaded and coloured image from the Shuttle Radar Topography Mission—shows an elevation model of New Zealand's Alpine Fault running about 500 km (300 mi) long. The escarpment is flanked by a chain of hills squeezed between the fault and the mountains of the Southern Alps. Northeast is towards the top.

The Southern Alps lie along a geological plate boundary, part of the Pacific Ring of Fire, with the Pacific Plate to the southeast pushing westward and colliding with the northward-moving Indo-Australian Plate to the northwest. Over the last 45 million years, the collision has pushed up a 20 km thickness of rocks on the Pacific Plate to form the Alps, although much of this has been eroded away. Uplift has been most rapid during the last 5 million years, and the mountains continue to be raised today by tectonic pressure, causing earthquakes on the Alpine Fault and other nearby faults. Despite the substantial uplift, most of the relative motion along the Alpine Fault is transverse, not vertical. However, significant dip-slip occurs on the plate boundary to the north and east of the North Island, in the Hikurangi Trough and Kermadec Trench. The transfer of motion from strike-slip on the Alpine Fault to dip-slip motion at these subduction zones to the north creates the Marlborough Fault System, which has resulted in significant uplift in the region.

In 2017 a large international team of scientists reported they had discovered beneath Whataroa, a small township on the Alpine Fault, "extreme" hydrothermal activity which "could be commercially very significant".

== Flora ==
The mountains are rich in flora with about 25% of the country's plant species being found above the treeline in alpine plant habitats and grassland with mountain beech forest at lower elevations (of the eastern side but not in Westland). The cold windswept slopes above the treeline are covered with areas of fellfield. To the east, the Alps descend to the Canterbury-Otago tussock grasslands. Plants adapted to the alpine conditions include woody shrubs like Hebe, Dracophyllum, and Coprosma, the conifer snow tōtara (Podocarpus nivalis) and Carex sedge grasses.

== Fauna ==
Wildlife of the mountains includes the endemic rock wren (Xenicus gilviventris). There are also a number of endemic insects adapted to these high altitudes, like flies, moths, beetles, bees, and the mountain stone wētā, which can freeze solid over winter to survive the alpine conditions. The beech forests of the lower elevations are important habitat for several birds, such as the great spotted kiwi (Apteryx haastii), the South Island kākā (Nestor meridionalis meridionalis), and the orange-fronted kākāriki (Cyanoramphus malherbi). The kea can be found in the forested foothills as well as higher, colder elevations. It is the world's only alpine parrot, and was once hunted as a pest.

== Threats and preservation ==
The mountains are inaccessible and retain their natural vegetation. A large proportion of the range is well protected by national parks—notably the Westland Tai Poutini National Park, Mount Aspiring National Park, and Aoraki / Mount Cook National Park—or by protected areas such as Lake Sumner Forest Park. Indigenous plant life is affected by introduced animals such as red deer (Cervus elaphus), chamois (Rupicapra rupicapra), and Himalayan tahr (Hemitragus jemlahicus), all of which have at times been targeted for culling. Likewise, native birds and reptiles are vulnerable to introduced predators.

== Panoramic view ==
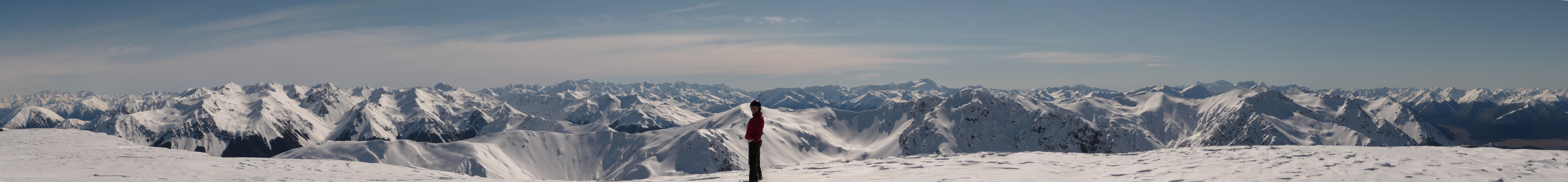
Panoramic winter view from the summit of Hamilton Peak in the Craigieburn Range.
