= Duncan Chessell =

Australian geologist

Duncan Chessell (born 1970 in Adelaide) is an Australian mountaineer, geologist and photographer who has reached the seven highest summits in each of the world's seven continents.

Chessell has been climbing since 1988, guiding since 1994, and has climbed and guided on all seven continents. He started out on the crags and in the gorges of National Parks of Australia, then moved on to larger mountains around the world. He is one of few Australian mountaineers to have climbed and guided Mount Everest and the first South Australian to summit. He has summited Mount Everest three times, in 2001, 2007 and 2010. His ascent in 2010 was from sea level, riding 1600km from the ocean in India.

In 2006, Chessell worked with a group of young people with cancer, known as CanTeen, guiding them to climb Mount Kilimanjaro. His favourite expedition was a sea-to-summit ascent of the highest peak in Antarctica, Mount Vinson in 2007, with fellow Australians Rob North, Peter Weeks, and Rob Jackson.

He founded DCXP Mountain Journeys Pty Ltd in late 2000, which he ran for a decade guiding the seven summits including guiding Mount Everest commercially and summiting Mount Everest three times. Other destinations included the Kokoda Track in Papua New Guinea, which his company DCXP guided thousands of Australian trekkers over between 2003 and 2010. He was a member of the New Zealand Mountain Guides Association.

In 2010, Chessell sold DCXP, and shifted back into the field of geology and became the managing director of the public mineral exploration company Endeavour Discoveries Ltd (2010-2016). Endeavour was based in South Australia exploring for base and precious metals such as nickel and gold in Papua New Guinea, South Australia and the Northern Territory. In 2011 he became the chairman of Endeavour Discoveries Ltd.

In 2014, Chessell was founding chairman of the Himalayan Development Foundation Australia Inc (HDFA) an organisation dedicated to the helping children in a Nepal get a start in life via education. The HDFA has raised over A$100,000 in its first year and built a boarding school in Nepal with some of the proceeds in the remote Kanchenjunga region of East Nepal. Over its first five years of operation HDFA has delivered school rebuilds, built health posts, micro hydroelectric schemes, upgraded education and livelihood programs to over 10,000 people in Nepal in three regions: Kanchenjunga, Indrawati and Sindhupalchowk delivering over A$1,000,000 in projects.

== See also ==
- Mountaineering
- List of Mount Everest summiters by number of times to the summit
