= Hooker Valley Track =

Walking path in the Canterbury Region, New Zealand

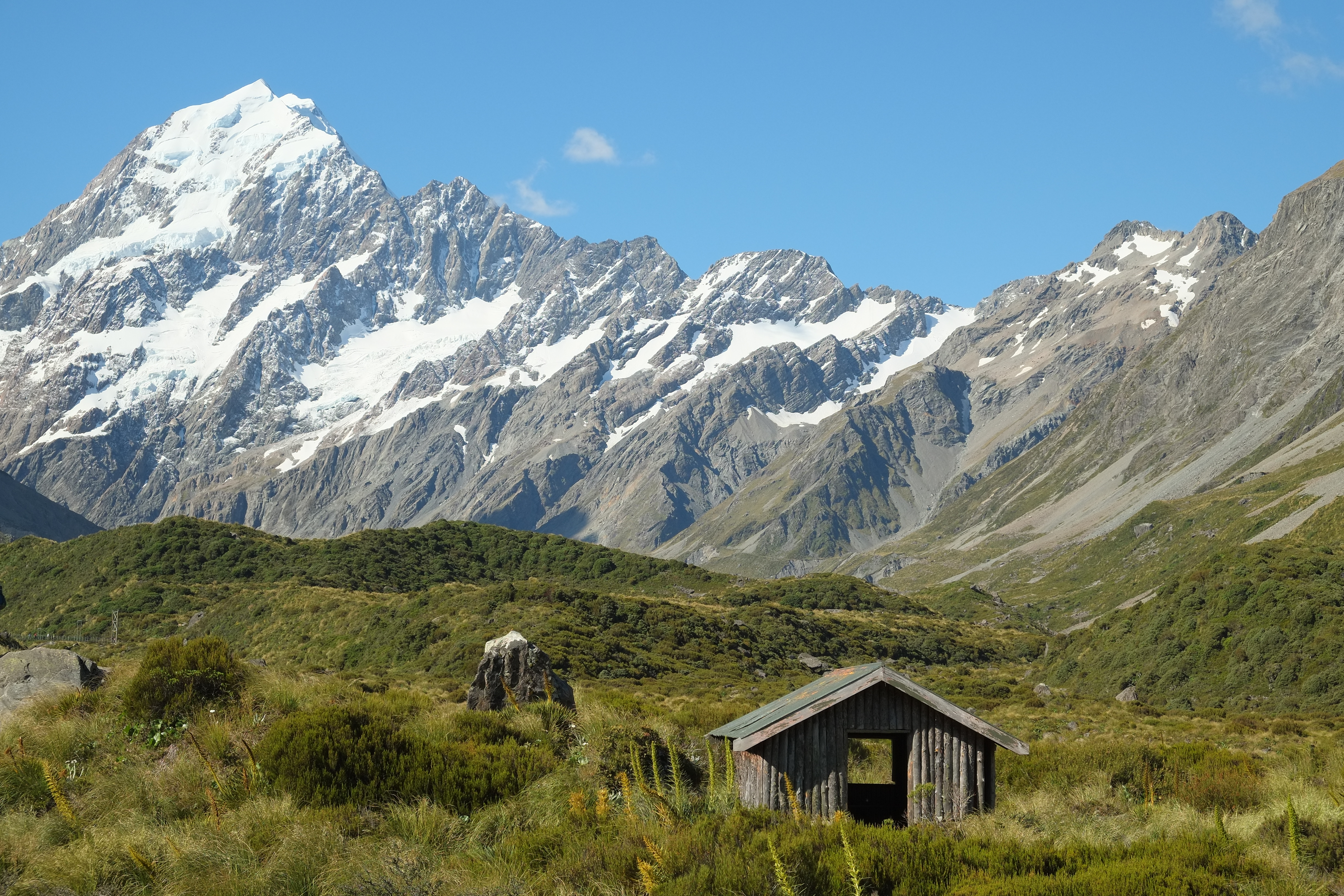
- Typical view from along the track - an old shelter at Stocking Stream, in front of Aoraki / Mount Cook
- Length: 5 km (3.1 mi)
- Location: Aoraki / Mount Cook National Park, New Zealand
- Designation: Walking track
- Trailheads: White Horse Hill camping ground, Hooker Lake
- Use: Tramping
- Highest point: Hooker Lake 877 m (2,877 ft)
- Lowest point: 760 m (2,490 ft)
- Difficulty: Easy
- Season: All year
- Sights: Wide glacier valleys with tussock vegetation, glaciers and glacier lakes, moraine ridges, clear views of Aoraki / Mount Cook and other snow-covered peaks (weather permitting)
- Hazards: Sunburn
- Surface: Fine gravel, well-formed
- Website: Department of Conservation

The Hooker Valley Track is the most popular short walking track within the Aoraki / Mount Cook National Park in New Zealand. At only 5 kilometres (3.1 mi) length and gaining only about 100 m (330 ft) in height, the well formed track can be walked by tourists with a wide range of level of fitness.

The track is maintained by the Department of Conservation and has views of Aoraki / Mount Cook and access to the proglacial Hooker Lake, typically with icebergs floating in it. Hooker Valley Track has been named one of the "best day walks in New Zealand".

The lookout point at the end of the Hooker Valley Track is the closest any walking track comes to Aoraki / Mount Cook, and reveals completely unobstructed views of the highest mountain in New Zealand, with Hooker Glacier in the valley below. There is also access to the shore of the glacial lake. The vegetation around the track is open alpine tussock, and as such the track offers clear views of the mountains surrounding the wide valley floor of the Hooker Valley.

== Etymology ==
The geographic Hooker items were named by the Canterbury provincial geologist, Julius von Haast, after the English botanist William Jackson Hooker.

== Description ==
The Hooker Valley Track starts at the White Horse Hill camping ground, which can be reached from Mount Cook Village by either a 4 km (2.5 mi) sealed road, or a walking track of similar length connecting Mount Cook Village with the camping ground. The walking track starts near the Hermitage Hotel. Adjacent to the camping ground, there is a car park, toilets, and a large modern shelter with informative panels.

In winter, the access road to the White Horse Hill camping ground can sometimes be closed to vehicles following snowfall, but can be walked along from Mount Cook Village to get to the start of the track. Alternatively, the connecting track from The Hermitage Hotel across the valley to the starting point of Hooker Valley Track is usually passable.

The start of the Hooker Valley Track leads through open grassland, as it passes close to the Alpine Memorial, a memorial to the mountaineers who have died in the Mount Cook National Park over the years. The memorial site overlooks the proglacial lake of Mueller Glacier. The plaque on the Alpine Memorial reads:

"To the memory of mountaineers and guides lost to the hills".

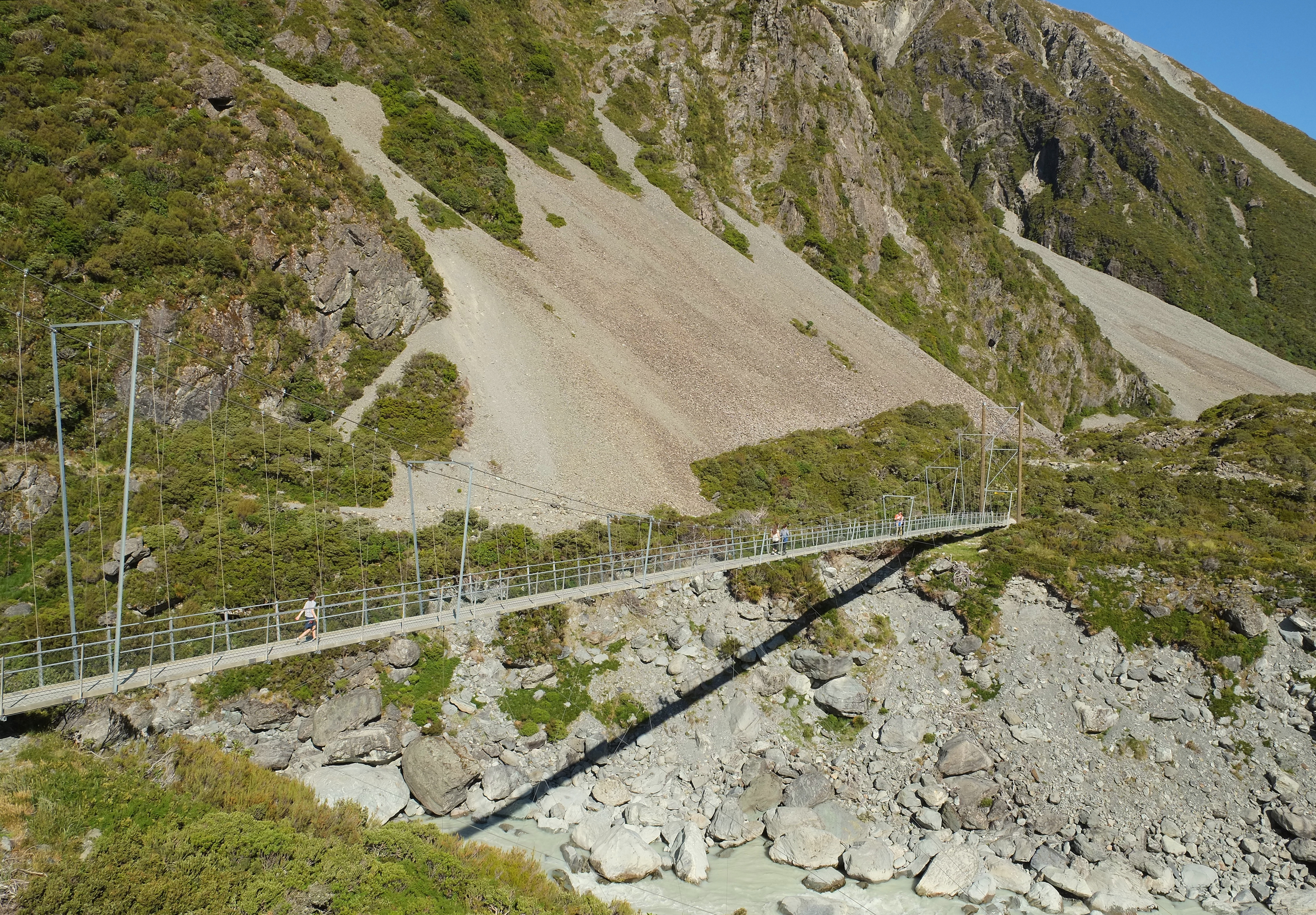
Suspension bridge over Hooker River upstream of Mueller Glacier lake

Shortly after the memorial site, the track crosses Hooker River downstream of the Mueller Glacier lake on the first of three solidly built large wooden suspension bridges (Lower Hooker Suspension Bridge), that were upgraded in 2015. As the track leads around the moraine wall damming Mueller Glacier lake, it crosses Hooker River again, this time upstream of Mueller Glacier lake. After this second bridge (Hooker Bluff Bridge), the track continues north further into the wide Hooker Valley, gradually revealing an open view towards the peaks of Aoraki / Mount Cook, which remain visible for the entire second half of the track.

The vegetation in this section of the track changes to snow tussock, spear grass, large mountain daisies, and Mount Cook Lily. All of these alpine plants flower in the summer months between December and February.

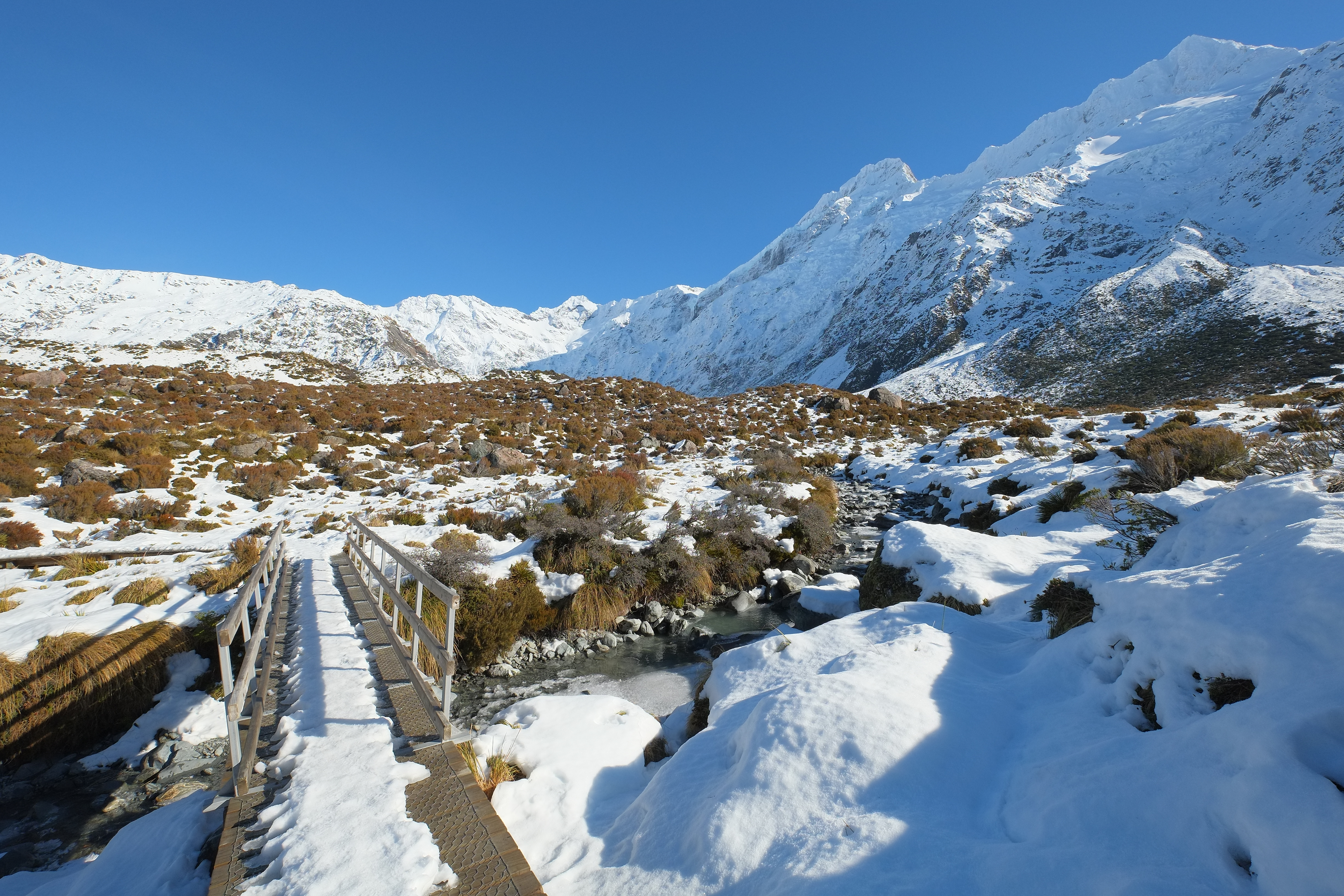
Bridge over Stocking Stream in winter

At times, the track leads close to the Hooker River, its water a bluish light grey colour due to the suspended glacial rock flour in the meltwater. At Stocking Stream, crossed by the track on a small footbridge, there is the concrete base which is the only remains of a previous hut at this location, as well as two self-composting toilets, the only toilets along the Hooker Valley Track.

North of Stocking Stream, the wide flat valley floor becomes swampy and the track continues on a wooden boardwalk before it reaches the last of the suspension bridges (Upper Hooker Bridge). The track crosses Hooker River a third time, just below the moraine walls of Hooker Lake. A short track leads off the main path to small tarn, before the track skirts around the moraine wall as it climbs gently to the height of the moraine wall, reaching a lookout point with picnic tables, overlooking the proglacial Hooker Lake. From the lookout, a small path leads down to the shore of the lake.

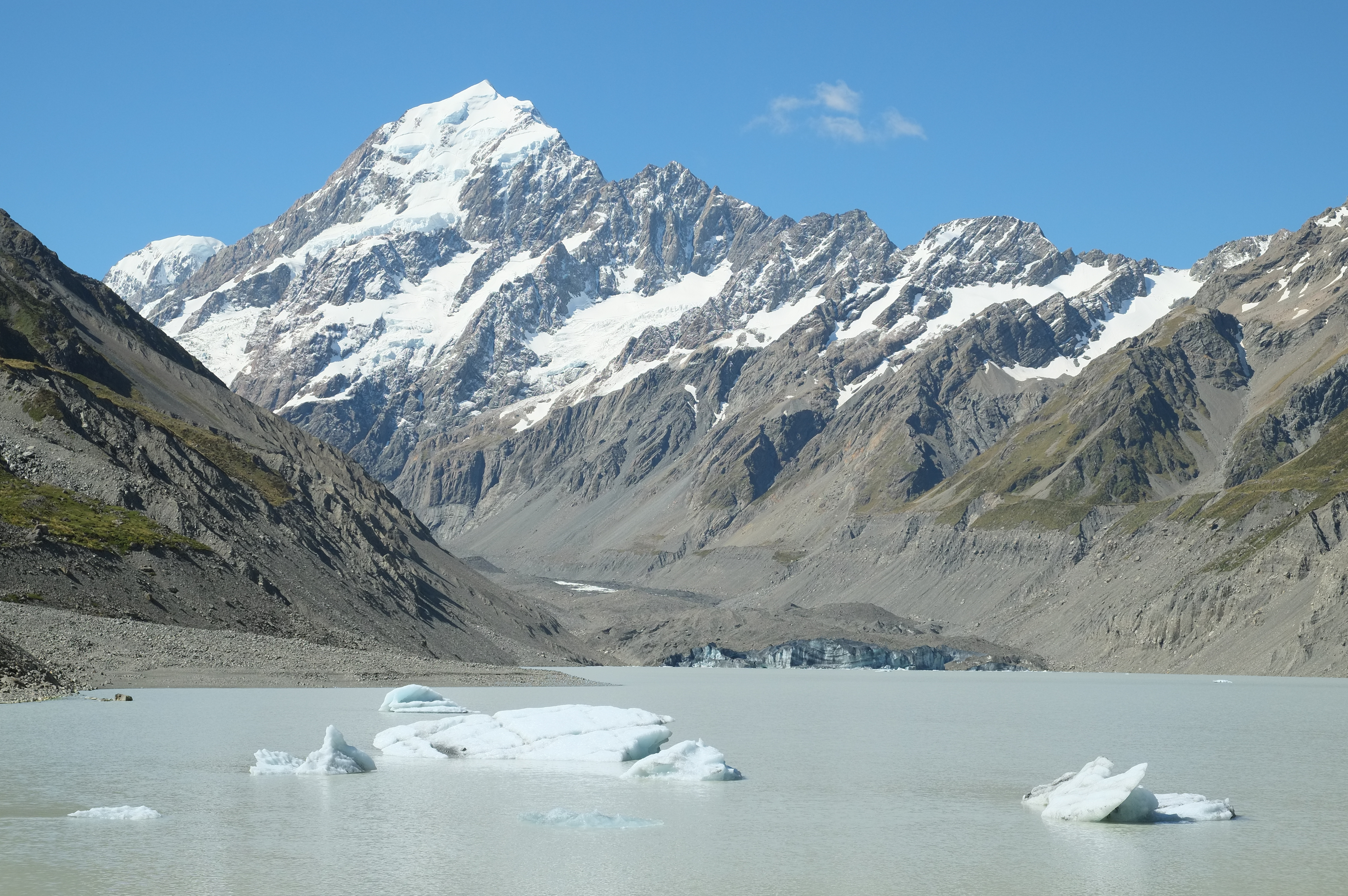
Icebergs floating in Hooker Lake in summer

During the summer months, icebergs can be seen floating in the lake, and the lookout also offers views across the lake to the terminus of Hooker Glacier.

== Location ==
| Point | Coordinates (links to map & photo sources) | Notes |
|---|---|---|
| White Horse Hill camping ground | 43.7188°S 170.0935°E | Large shelter with information panels and toilets, next to car park |
| Alpine Memorial | 43.7181°S 170.0971°E | Memorial to mountaineers who died in Mount Cook National Park |
| Suspension bridge | 43.7158°S 170.1031°E | Bridge over Hooker River downstream of Mueller Glacier lake |
| Suspension bridge | 43.7055°S 170.1000°E | Bridge over Hooker River upstream of Mueller Glacier lake |
| Stocking Stream shelter | 43.6983°S 170.0969°E | Remains of shelter (concrete base only) and self-composting toilets |
| Suspension bridge | 43.6927°S 170.0985°E | Bridge over Hooker River downstream of Hooker Lake |
| Hooker Lake lookout | 43.6893°S 170.1033°E | Lookout point with picnic benches |

== See also ==
- Hooker Lake
