= Aoraki / Mount Cook =

Highest mountain in New Zealand

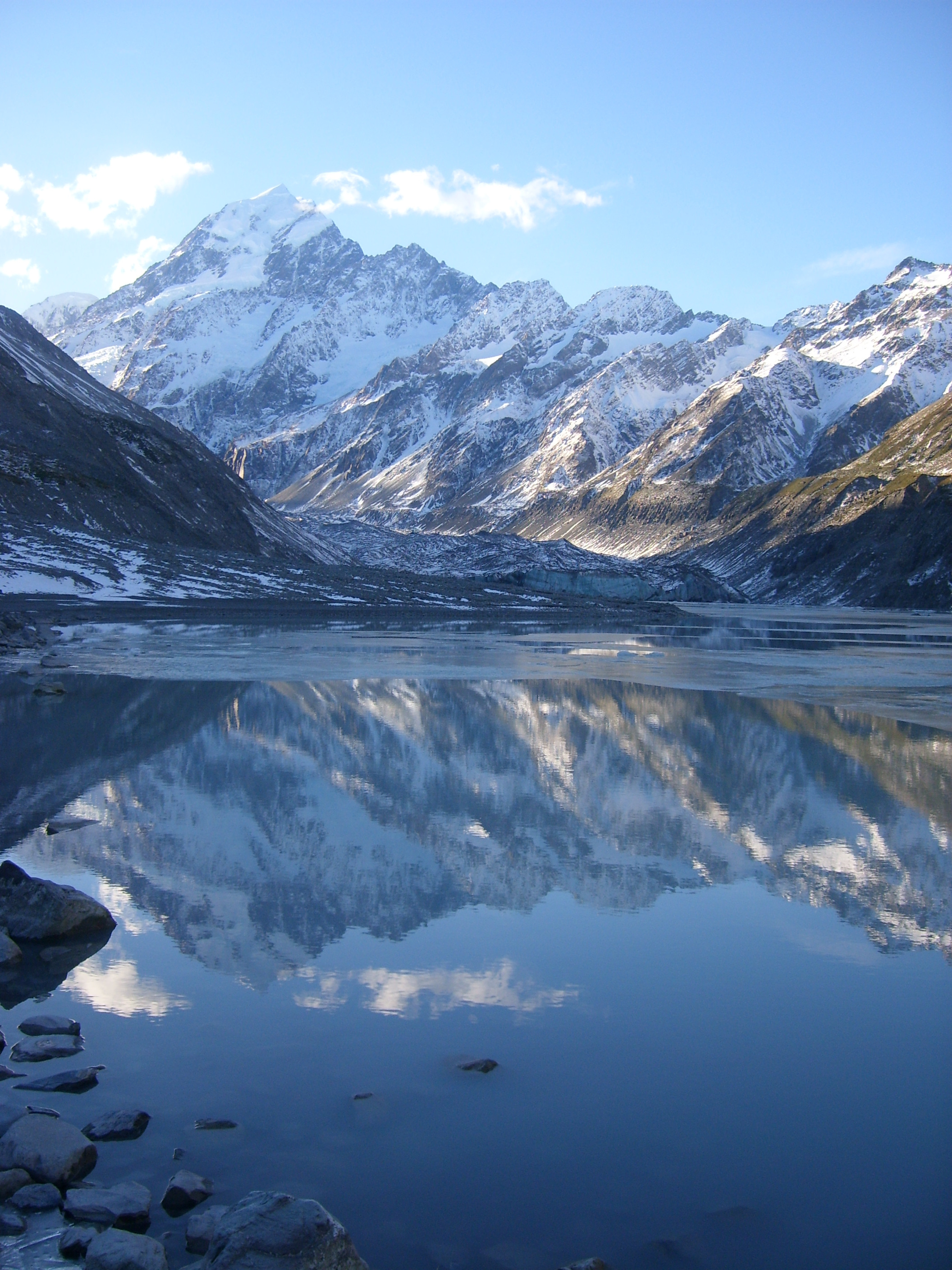
- Aoraki / Mount Cook seen from Hooker Valley

Highest point
- Elevation: 3,724 m (12,218 ft)
- Prominence: 3,724 m (12,218 ft); Ranked 39th
- Listing: Country high point Ultra; World's most isolated peaks 10th
- Coordinates: 43°35′42″S 170°8′31″E

Geography
- Location in New Zealand
- Location: South Island, New Zealand
- Parent range: Southern Alps

Climbing
- First ascent: 1894 by Tom Fyfe, George Graham, Jack Clarke
- Easiest route: Linda Glacier

Aoraki / Mount Cook (Note: /maʊnt kʊk/; Māori pronunciation: [aɔraki]) (Note: The official name, as set by the Ngāi Tahu Claims Settlement Act 1998 is Aoraki/Mount Cook. Both names, Aoraki and Mount Cook are commonly used, and the mountain is also called Aoraki Mount Cook, with punctuation between the names varying or omitted entirely in non-official use.) is the highest mountain in New Zealand. Its height, as of 2014, is listed as 3,724 metres (12,218 feet). It is situated in the Southern Alps, the mountain range that runs the length of the South Island. A popular tourist destination, it is also a favourite challenge for mountaineers. Aoraki / Mount Cook consists of three summits: from south to north, the Low Peak (3,593 m or 11,788 ft), the Middle Peak (3,717 m or 12,195 ft) and the High Peak. The summits lie slightly south and east of the main divide of the Southern Alps, with the Tasman Glacier to the east and the Hooker Glacier to the southwest. Mount Cook is ranked 10th in the world by topographic isolation.

== Location ==
The mountain is in the Aoraki / Mount Cook National Park, in the Canterbury Region. The park was established in 1953 and along with Westland Tai Poutini National Park, Mount Aspiring National Park and Fiordland National Park forms one of the UNESCO World Heritage Sites. The park contains more than 140 peaks standing over 2,000 metres (6,600 ft) and 72 named glaciers, which cover 40 percent of its 700 square kilometres (170,000 acres).

The peak is located at the northern end of the Mount Cook Range, where it meets with the main spine of the Main Divide, forming a massif between the Hooker Valley to the southwest and the Tasman Valley east of the mountain. These two valleys provide the closest easily accessible view points of Aoraki / Mount Cook. A lookout point at the end of the Hooker Valley Track located only 10 kilometres (6 mi) from the peak has views of the entire mountainside.

The settlement of Mount Cook Village, also referred to as "Aoraki / Mount Cook", is a tourist centre and base camp for the mountain. It is 7 kilometres (4.3 mi) from the end of the Tasman Glacier and 15 kilometres (9.3 mi) south of Aoraki / Mount Cook's summit.

On clear days, Aoraki / Mount Cook is visible from the West Coast as far north as Te Miko, some 194 km (120 mi) away, and from most of State Highway 80 along Lake Pukaki and State Highway 6 south of Lake Pukaki. The near horizontal ridge connecting the mountain's three summits forms a distinctive blocky shape when viewed from an eastern or western direction. Another popular view point is from Lake Matheson on the West Coast, described as the "view of views", where on calm days, the peaks of Aoraki / Mount Cook and Mt Tasman are reflected in Lake Matheson.

== Local climate ==
Aoraki / Mount Cook receives substantial orographic precipitation throughout the year, as breezy, moisture-laden westerly winds dominate all year-round, bringing rainclouds from the Tasman Sea with them.

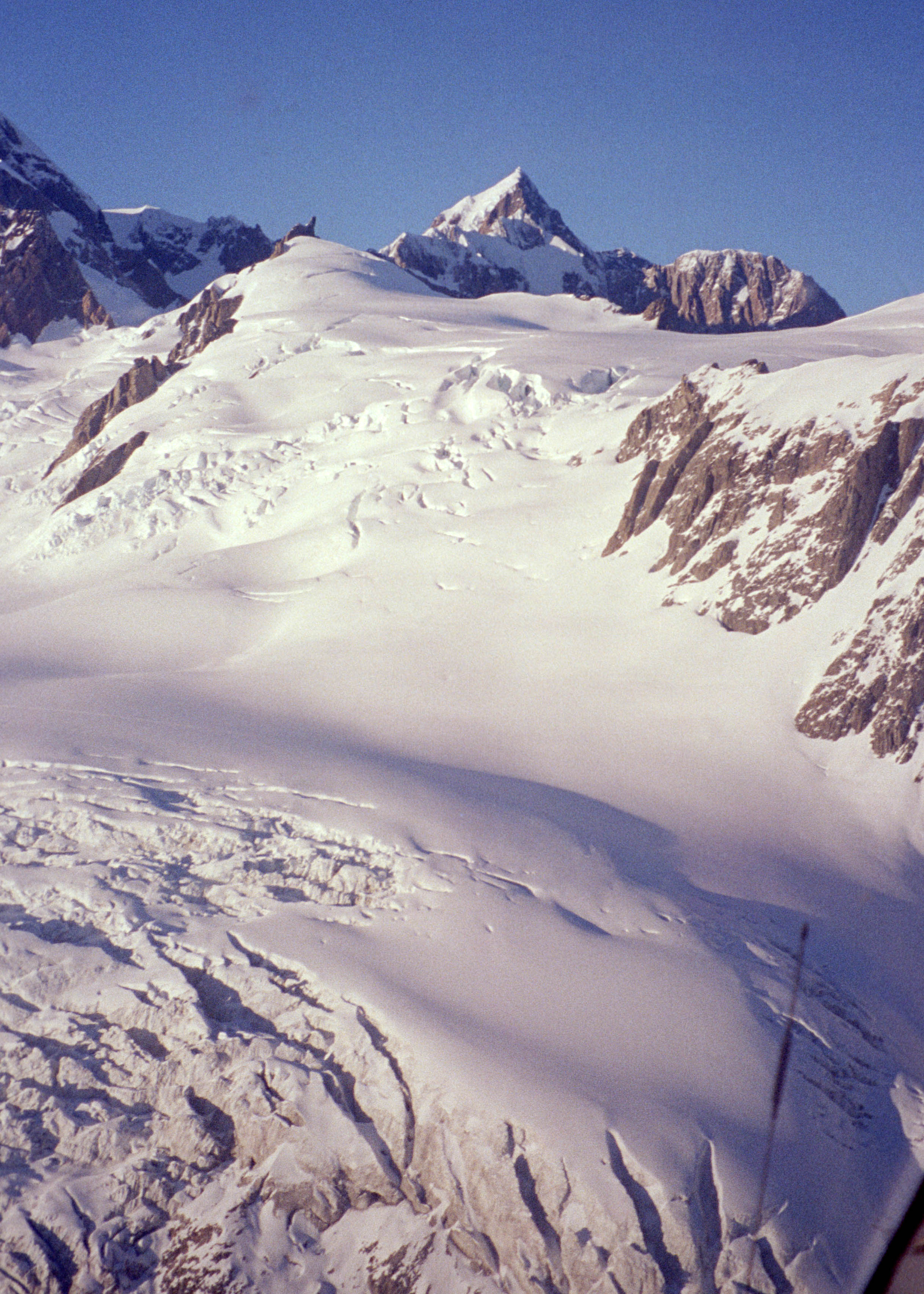
Aoraki / Mount Cook from above Franz Joseph Glacier

Annual precipitation around the mountain ranges varies greatly as the local climate is dominated by the eastward movement of depressions and anticyclones from across the Tasman Sea. The Aoraki / Mount Cook massif is a major obstacle to the prevailing westerly winds as they push depressions and associated cold fronts of moist air from the subtropics in the northwest against the mountain range. As the air rises towards the peaks, it expands and cools, and forms clouds. Rain and snowfall are often heaviest around the 1,200 m (3,900 ft) level and can last for several days if the front is slow-moving.

As a result of the local weather patterns, the western slopes of Aoraki / Mount Cook can receive well over 10,000 mm (400 in) of annual precipitation, whereas the nearby Mount Cook Village, only 15 km (9 mi) south of the mountain, receives 4,484 mm (176.5 in) of rain or snowfall. While the weather on the eastern side of the mountain is generally better, rain or snow can quickly become widespread on that side as well if the wind turns to the south or southeast. This brings with it a rapid drop in temperature and poor visibility, adding to the difficult climbing conditions on Aoraki / Mount Cook.

Temperatures at the mountain's base in the Hooker Valley around 800 metres (2,600 feet) range from −13 °C (9 °F) to 32 °C (90 °F), and generally fall just over 1 °C (1.8 °F) for every 200 metres (660 ft) of altitude.

From about 1,000 m (3,000 ft) and higher, semi-permanent snow and ice fields exist during winter. Winter and spring are usually less settled than summer and autumn. Anticyclones often bring days of settled weather in summer, or clear cold conditions in winter with severe frost.

== Naming and European discovery ==
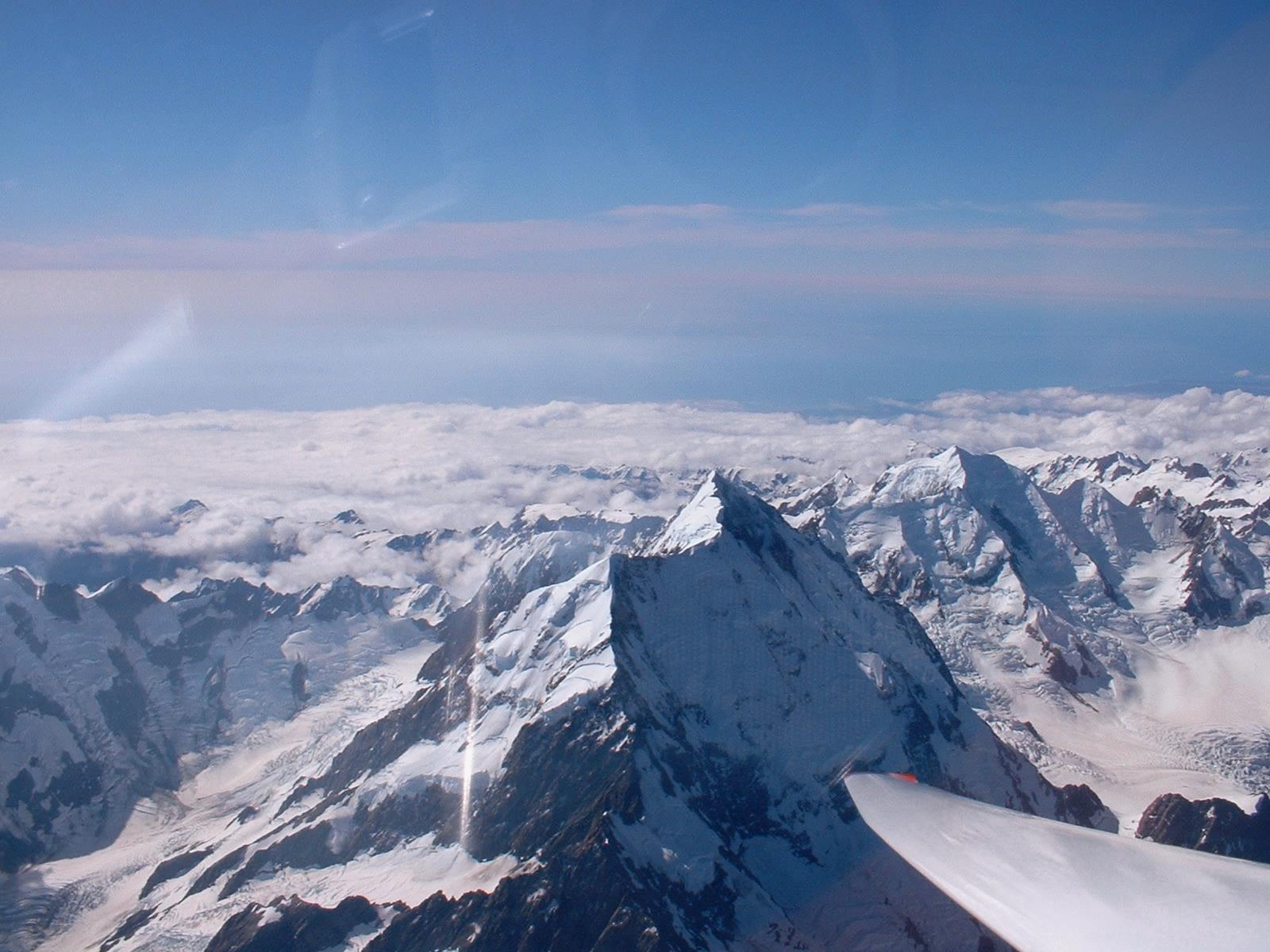
Aoraki / Mount Cook seen from the south, taken from 4,000 metres (13,123 ft)

In the traditions of the Ngāi Tahu iwi an early name for the South Island is Te Waka o Aoraki ('Aoraki's Canoe'). In the past many believed it meant "Cloud Piercer", a romantic rendering of the name's components: ao (world, daytime, cloud, etc.) and raki or rangi (day, sky, weather, etc.). Historically, the Māori name has been spelt Aorangi, using the northern dialect.

Aoraki / Mount Cook became known to Māori after their arrival in New Zealand some time around the 14th century CE. The first Europeans who may have seen Aoraki / Mount Cook were members of Abel Tasman's crew, who saw a "large land uplifted high" (probably some part of the Southern Alps) while off the west coast of the South Island, just north of present-day Greymouth on 13 December 1642 during Tasman's first Pacific voyage. The English name of Mount Cook was given to the mountain in 1851 by Captain John Lort Stokes to honour Captain James Cook who surveyed and circumnavigated the islands of New Zealand in 1770. Captain Cook did not sight the mountain during his exploration.

Following the settlement between Ngāi Tahu and the Crown in 1998, a number of South Island place names were amended to incorporate their Māori names by the Ngāi Tahu Claims Settlement Act 1998. The name of the mountain was officially changed from Mount Cook to Aoraki/Mount Cook to incorporate its historic Māori name. It is the only one of these names where the Māori name precedes the English. Under the settlement the Crown agreed to return title of Aoraki / Mount Cook to Ngāi Tahu, who would then formally gift it back to the nation. Neither transfer has yet occurred, and Ngāi Tahu can decide when this will happen.

== Geology ==
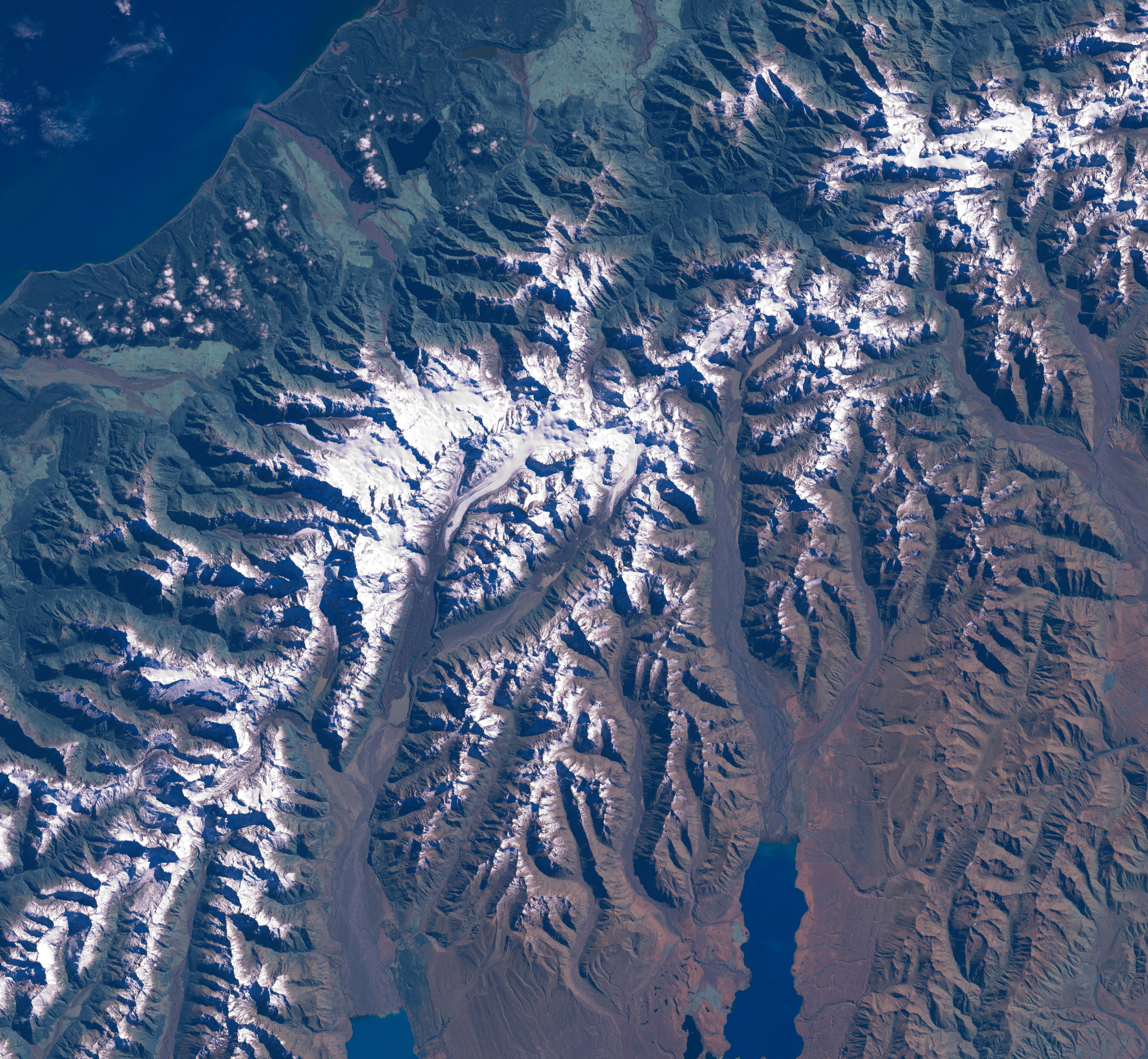
Aoraki / Mount Cook from Landsat 7

The Southern Alps in the South Island were formed by tectonic uplifting and pressure as the Pacific and Indo-Australian Plates collided along the island's western coast. The uplifting continues, raising Aoraki / Mount Cook an average of 7 millimetres (0.28 in) each year. However, erosive forces are also powerful shapers of the mountains. The severe weather is due to the mountain's jutting into powerful westerly winds of the Roaring Forties which run around approximately 45°S latitude, south of both Africa and Australia. The Southern Alps are the first obstacle the winds encounter after South America, having moved east across the Southern Ocean.

The height of Aoraki / Mount Cook was established in 1881 by G. J. Roberts (from the west side) and in 1889 by T. N. Brodrick (from the Canterbury side). Their measurements agreed closely at 12,349 feet (3,764 m). The height was reduced by 10 metres (33 ft) when approximately 12–14 million cubic metres of rock and ice fell off the northern peak on 14 December 1991. Two decades of erosion of the ice cap exposed after this collapse reduced the height by another 30 m (98 ft) to 3,724 m (12,218 ft).

Aoraki / Mount Cook lies in the centre of the distinctive Alpine Fault, a 650 km (400 mi) long active fault in the Southern Alps. It is responsible for the uplift of Aoraki / Mount Cook and is believed to move every 100 to 300 years. It last moved in 1717.

== Surrounding forests and glaciers ==
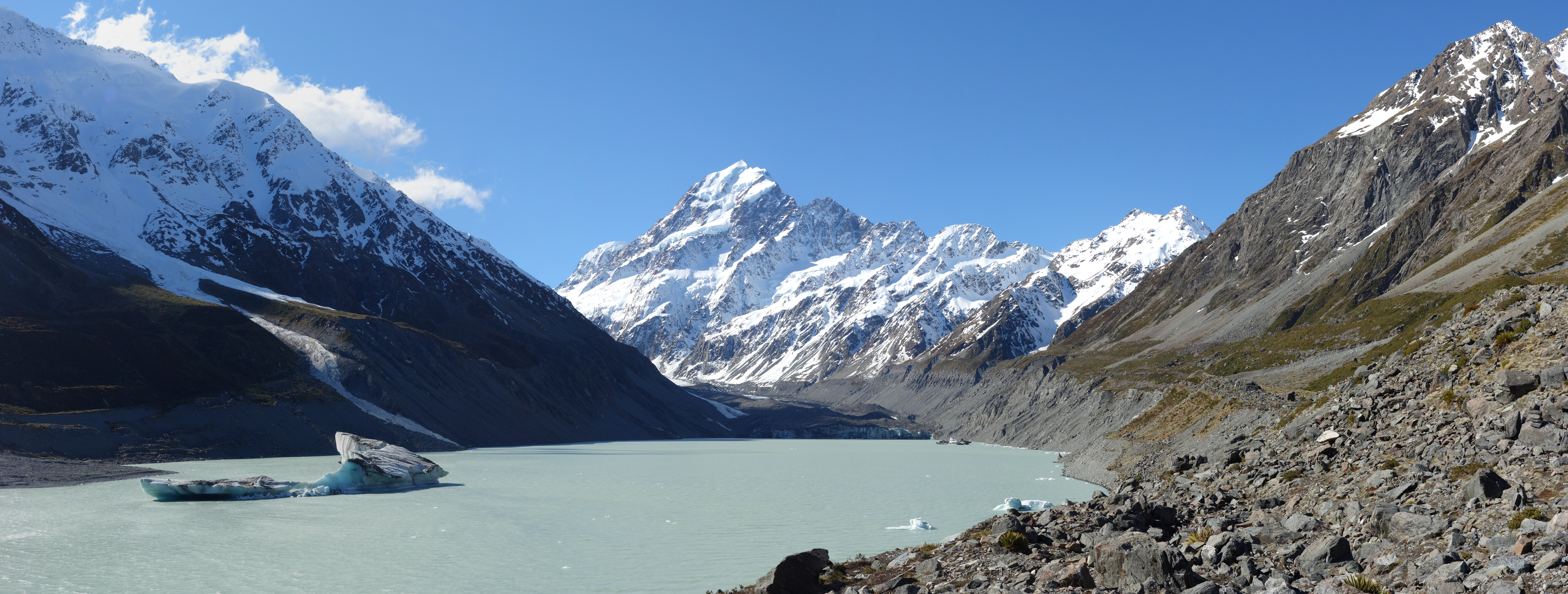
Aoraki / Mount Cook as seen from the end of the Hooker Valley Track, with the Hooker Glacier's moraine lake in the foreground.

The average annual rainfall in the surrounding lowlands, in particular to the west, is around 5 to 10 metres (200 to 390 in). This very high rainfall leads to temperate rainforests in these coastal lowlands and a reliable source of snow in the mountains to keep the glaciers flowing. These include the Tasman Glacier to the east of the mountain and the smaller Hooker Glacier immediately to its south.

The vegetation in the valleys to the east, in particular the Tasman Valley, is noticeably less lush than that on the western slopes of the mountain. Forest would normally grow to about 1,300 m (4,300 ft) in this area, but a lack of soil due to scree, rock falls and the effects of glaciation prevent this in most localities around the mountain. Snow tussock and other alpine plants cling to as high as 1,900 m (6,200 ft). Above the snowline, only lichen can be found amongst the rock, snowfields and ice that dominate the highest parts of Aoraki / Mount Cook.

== Climbing history ==
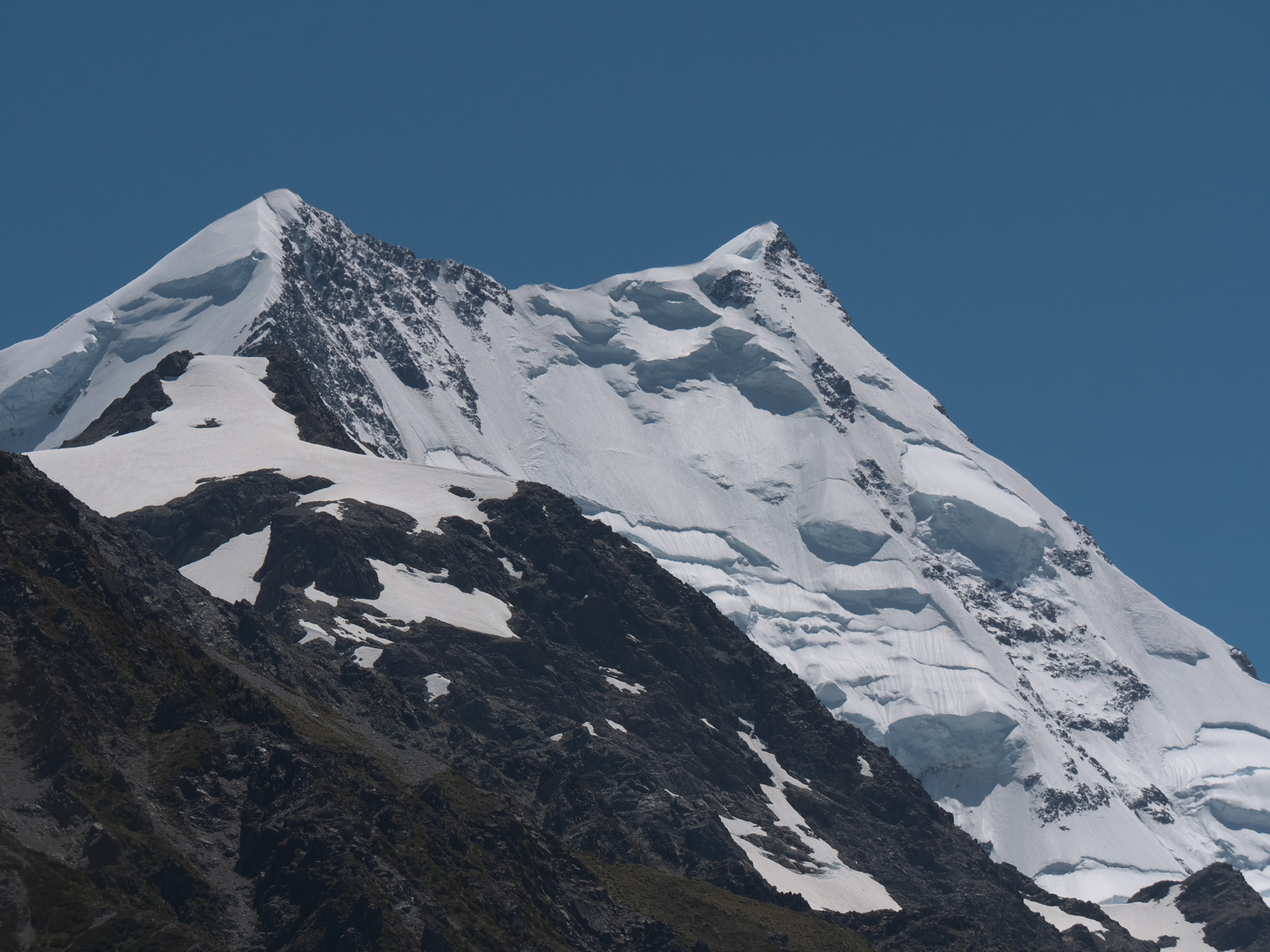
View of Aoraki / Mount Cook from the Tasman Lake south of the mountain

The first recorded attempt on the summit was made by the Irishman Rev. William S. Green, the Swiss hotelier Emil Boss, and the Swiss mountain guide Ulrich Kaufmann on 2 March 1882 via the Tasman and Linda Glaciers. They came within a few feet of the top, as did the 1890 ascent attempt by Mannering and Dixon.

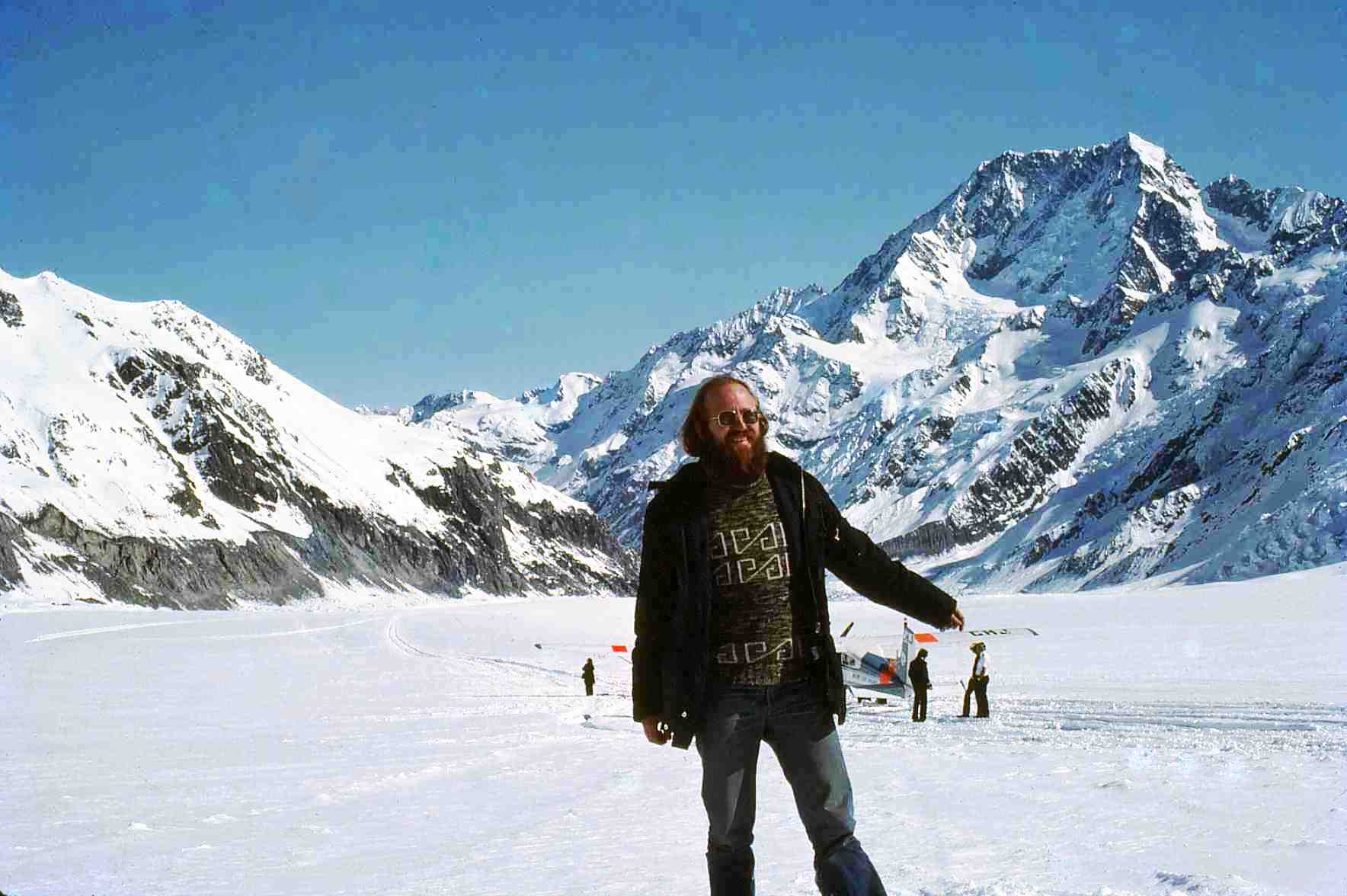
On Aoraki / Mount Cook, 1977

The first known ascent was on 25 December 1894, when New Zealanders Tom Fyfe, John Michael (Jack) Clarke and George Graham reached the summit via the Hooker Valley and the north ridge. Despite an earlier failed attempt on 20 December, the local climbers were spurred on by their desire for the first ascent to be made by New Zealand mountaineers amid reports that the American mountaineer Edward FitzGerald had his eye on the summit. The party reached the summit at approximately 1:30 pm after bounding up the last leg of the mountain full of excitement at reaching the top. The route they had successfully traversed was not repeated again until the 100th ascent over 60 years later in 1955.

Swiss guide Matthias Zurbriggen of FitzGerald's party made the second ascent on 14 March 1895 from the Tasman Glacier side, via the ridge that now bears his name. This is credited as the first solo ascent, although Zurbriggen was accompanied part of the way up the ridge by J Adamson. After Zurbriggen's ascent it was another ten years before the mountain was climbed again. In February 1905 Jack Clarke with four others completed the third ascent following Zurbriggen's route. Clarke therefore became the first person to do a repeat ascent.

The first woman to ascend the mountain was Australian Freda Du Faur on 3 December 1910. Local guide George Bannister, a nephew of another guide, Butler Te Koeti of Ngāi Tahu, was the first Māori to successfully scale the peak in 1912. A traverse of the three peaks was first accomplished in 1913 by Freda Du Faur and guides Alec and Peter Graham. This 'grand traverse' was repeated in January 1916 by Conrad Kain, guiding the 57-year-old Jane Thomson, considered at the time "a marvellous feat unequalled for daring in the annals of the Southern Alps".

Sir Edmund Hillary made his first ascent in January 1948. In February 1948 with Ruth Adams, Harry Ayres and Mick Sullivan, Hillary made the first ascent of the South Ridge to the Low Peak. To celebrate the life of Hillary the South Ridge was renamed as Hillary Ridge in August 2011.

Aoraki / Mount Cook is a technically challenging mountain with a high level of glaciation. Its level of difficulty is often underestimated and can change dramatically depending on weather, snow and ice conditions. The climb crosses large crevasses, and involves risks of ice and rock falls, avalanches and rapidly changing weather conditions.

Since the early 20th century, around 80 people have died attempting to climb the mountain, making it New Zealand's deadliest peak. The climbing season traditionally runs from November to February, and hardly a season goes by without at least one fatality.

== Māori history, legends and traditions ==
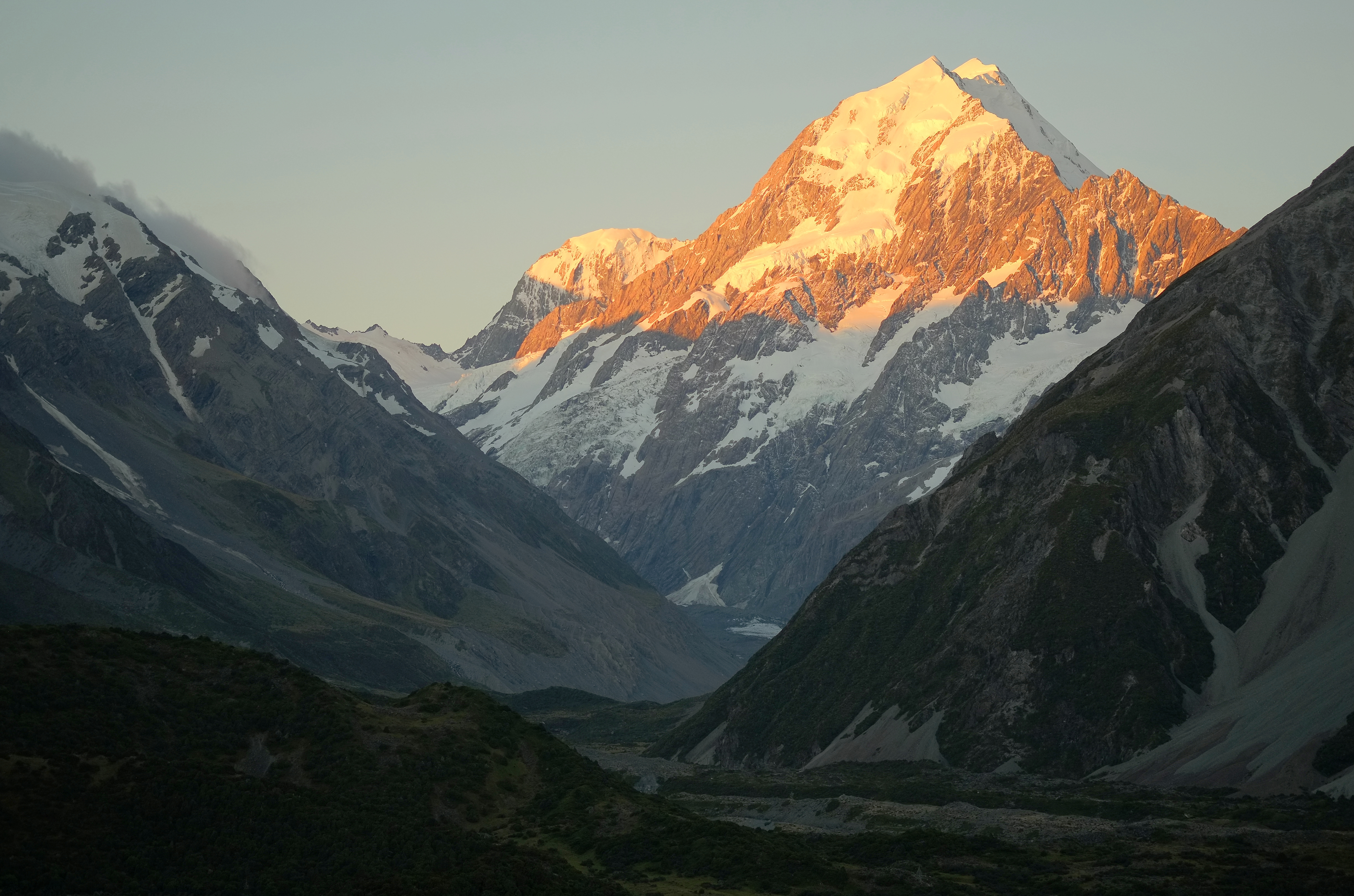
Aoraki / Mount Cook at sunset from Hooker Valley

According to Māori legend, Aoraki was a young boy who, along with his three brothers, were the sons of Rakinui, the Sky Father. On their voyage around the Papatūānuku, the Earth Mother, their canoe became stranded on a reef and tilted. Aoraki and his brothers climbed onto the top side of their canoe. However, the south wind froze them and turned them to stone. Their canoe became the Te Waka o Aoraki, the South Island, and their prows, the Marlborough Sounds. Aoraki, the tallest, became the highest peak, and his brothers created the Kā Tiritiri o te Moana, the Southern Alps.

Ngāi Tahu, the main iwi (tribe) of New Zealand's southern region, consider Aoraki as the most sacred of the ancestors that they had descended from. Aoraki brings the iwi with its sense of community and purpose, and remains the physical form of Aoraki and the link between the worlds of the supernatural and nature.

== Post-contact timeline ==
- 1642 – Aoraki was possibly sighted by Abel Tasman and crew members.
- 1770 – Captain Cook named Kā-Tiritiri-o-te-moana "the Southern Alps".
- 1851 – Captain John Lort Stokes of the survey ship HMS Acheron gave the name Mount Cook to Aoraki.
- 1894 – The first known ascent of Aoraki took place on 25 December, by Jack Clarke, Tom Fyfe and George Graham.
- 1910 – Freda du Faur became the first known woman to climb Aoraki.
- 1913 – The first ascents of The Footstool and Kakīroa (or Maukatua, Mount Sefton) were made by Freda du Faur's climbing party.
- 1914 – The first recorded fatal accident occurred, when three men were caught in avalanche on Linda Glacier.
- 1975 – Four Royal New Zealand Air Force personnel were killed during a mountain survival training exercise near the Ball Pass, when they were buried alive by an avalanche.
- 1982 – Mark Inglis and his climbing partner Phillip Doole were trapped in a snow cave for 13 days in an intense blizzard. During his rescue an RNZAF 3 Squadron Bell UH-1H crashed on Aoraki.
- 1982 – Geoff Wyatt and John Blennehasset achieved the first ski descent from the summit.
- 1991 – An avalanche of 10 million cubic metres of snow and rock caused 10 metres (33 ft) to be lost off the top of Aoraki. Two decades of erosion of the ice cap exposed after this collapse reduced the height by another 30 m (98 ft) to 3,724 m (12,218 ft), as revealed by new GPS data from a University of Otago climbing expedition in November 2013.
- 1998 – The Ngāi Tahu Claims Settlement Act officially recognised the original name, renaming the mountain Aoraki / Mount Cook.

== Other ==
In 2027, Aoraki / Mount Cook will become one of four natural attractions that will start charging entry fees for foreign tourists. Under the proposed scheme, foreign visitors will be required to pay between NZ$20 (€10) and NZ$40 (€20) to access the natural landmarks, generating up to €32 million to invest in natural sites.

== In popular culture ==
Aoraki / Mount Cook has featured on various New Zealand postage stamps since 1898. It is also pictured on New Zealand's current $5 note and was depicted along with a kea and Mount Cook lily on former $10 notes.

The film The Hobbit: An Unexpected Journey used aerial footage of Aoraki / Mount Cook and surrounding peaks as backdrops in some scenes. Several documentaries and docu-dramas have been filmed on the mountain.

== See also ==
- List of mountains of New Zealand by height
