= List of World Heritage Sites in New Zealand =

Location of World Heritage Sites in New Zealand. The New Zealand Subantarctic Islands (five locations) are not shown on the map.

The United Nations Educational, Scientific and Cultural Organization (UNESCO) World Heritage Sites are places of importance to cultural or natural heritage as described in the UNESCO World Heritage Convention, established in 1972. Cultural heritage consists of monuments (such as architectural works, monumental sculptures, or inscriptions), groups of buildings, and sites (including archaeological sites). Natural features (consisting of physical and biological formations), geological and physiographical formations (including habitats of threatened species of animals and plants), and natural sites which are important from the point of view of science, conservation or natural beauty, are defined as natural heritage. New Zealand accepted the convention on 22 November 1984, making its historical sites eligible for inclusion on the list.

There are three World Heritage Sites in New Zealand and a further eight sites on the tentative list. The first two sites were listed in 1990 and the third one in 1998. Tongariro National Park is listed for its cultural and natural significance while the other two sites are natural. New Zealand has served on the World Heritage Committee once.

== World Heritage Sites ==
UNESCO lists sites under ten criteria; each entry must meet at least one of the criteria. Criteria i through vi are cultural, and vii through x are natural.

World Heritage Sites
Site	Image	Location (region)	Year listed	UNESCO data	Description
Tongariro National Park	Landscape with shrubs and a volcanic peak in the background	Manawatū-Whanganui	1990	421bis; vi, vii, viii (mixed)	Located at the terminus of the Pacific Ring of Fire, the park has active and extinct volcanoes, craters, vents, lava fields, and lakes. There are signs of glacial activity, with the remaining glaciers being limited to the slopes of Mount Ruapehu. There are diverse habitat types, including lowland broadleaf rainforests, southern beech forests, and ice fields at high elevations. In 1990, the site was listed due to its natural significance, however, following the revised criteria, in 1993 it became the first site to be listed under the criteria for a cultural landscape. The mountains are sacred to the Māori people as they signify the spiritual link between the people and nature.
Te Wahipounamu – South West New Zealand	A hiking path through shrubland towards snow-covered mountains	Otago, Southland, West Coast	1990	551; vii, viii, ix, x (natural)	This large national park covers 10% of New Zealand's landmass. It is located on the coast of the south-west part of the South Island and contains parts of the Southern Alps mountain range. The landscape has been shaped by glaciers and there are fiords, gorges, and a rugged coastline. The flora and fauna are representative of the ancient Gondwana biota that has survived here longer than elsewhere due to the isolation of the islands. There are southern beech and podocarp forests, temperate rainforests, grasslands, and wetlands. The absence of mammalian predators resulted in the evolution of particular fauna that includes the southern brown kiwi, takahē, and kea. The kākāpō parrot lived on the mainland until the early 1980s, but now survives only on some offshore islands.
New Zealand Sub-Antarctic Islands	A group of sea lions on a beach	New Zealand Subantarctic Islands	1998	877; ix, x (natural)	This site comprises five groups of islands in the Southern Ocean: Antipodes, Auckland, Bounty, the Snares, and Campbell Islands. Located in a highly productive ocean, they are home to large and diverse communities of seabirds and penguins, including some species that live only here. There are ten species of albatross, the rare Bounty shag, and large numbers of sooty shearwaters. The islands are home to the majority of New Zealand sea lions (a group on the Enderby Island pictured) and the waters are breeding areas for the southern right whale. The typical flora on the islands are the megaherbs, plants that have evolved to large sizes as an adaptation to the harsh environment.

== Tentative list ==
In addition to sites inscribed on the World Heritage List, member states can maintain a list of tentative sites that they may consider for nomination. Nominations for the World Heritage List are only accepted if the site was previously listed on the tentative list. New Zealand maintains eight properties on its tentative list.

Tentative sites
Site	Image	Location (region)	Year listed	UNESCO criteria	Description
Auckland volcanic fields	Grass-covered terraces on the slopes of a volcanic cone	Auckland	2007	ii, iii, iv, v, viii (mixed)	The cultural landscape around Auckland has been shaped by volcanic activity and by the Māori people through centuries. The former resulted in numerous volcanic cones, each of them produced in a single eruptive episode, with the last eruption taking place 600 years ago. There are scoria and maar craters and lava fields. The slopes of the cones were modified by the Māori to form terraces to support gardens on fertile volcanic soils, as well as fortifications. The terraces on Maungakiekie / One Tree Hill are pictured.
Waters and seabed of Fiordland (Te Moana O Atawhenua)	View of a fiord with cloud cover	Southland	2007	vii, viii, ix, x (natural)	This is a proposed extension to the Te Wahipounamu World Heritage Site, with an emphasis on the seabed and fiords in the region. The waters have two types of environments. The outer shores are breeding grounds for fur seals and ocean birds, while the long and steep-walled fiords can reach depths up to 420 m (1,380 ft) and have different marine life than the coastal waters. The extension comprises eight marine reserves, including the Te Tapuwae o Hua (Long Sound) Marine Reserve (pictured).
Kahurangi National Park, Farewell Spit and Canaan karst system	River through hills and mountains covered by lush vegetation	West Coast	2007	vii, viii, ix, x (natural)	Kahurangi National Park has numerous diverse habitats, including temperate rainforests, grasslands, dunes, and swamps, as well as mountain landforms such as alpine bogs, screes, cirques, grasslands, and shrublands. The Farewell Spit is a 30 km (19 mi) long spit, a sand formation protecting the Golden Bay / Mohua. It is an important habitat for shore birds.
Kerikeri Basin historic precinct	19th century stone houses near a river	Northland	2007	ii, iii, iv, v, vi (cultural)	The basin of the Kerikeri River was inhabited by the Māori people before the arrival of the Europeans. It was a point of contact between the locals and the Christian missionaries who established a mission here in 1819, as the first European settlement in New Zealand. Two of the buildings that have been preserved, the Mission House from 1822, and the Stone Store from 1836, are the oldest building and the oldest stone building in the country, respectively. The Māori settlement was located nearby.
Kermadec Islands and Marine reserve	A view of the ocean and some islets through vegetation	New Zealand outlying islands	2007	vii, viii, ix, x (natural)	The group of islands is located around 1,100 km (680 mi) north-east of the North Island. The largest island is Raoul Island (pictured). Both the islands and the surrounding marine reserve are strictly protected. Since the 1990s, a rehabilitation project has been going on on the islands to remove weeds and pests brought by humans.
Napier Art Deco historic precinct	An Art Deco building with the words Halsbury Chambers 1932 above the entrance	Hawke's Bay	2007	ii, iv, vi (cultural)	In 1931, a major earthquake destroyed the town of Napier that was originally founded in the 1850s. Reconstruction took place in the Art Deco style, with new buildings being limited to two storeys. Reinforced concrete was used and older materials such as bricks were banned. The buildings have low relief ornamentation with prevailing Art Deco motifs but also with Māori designs.
Whakarua Moutere (North East Islands)	A view at an island with steep rocky slopes from the sea level	Northland	2007	vii, viii, ix, x (natural)	This nomination comprises nine clusters of islands and marine sites along the northern coast of North Island. Two of the islands have marine reserves established in the waters around them. The islands importantly help the conservation and recovery of the species that are threatened on the mainland. Manawatāwhi / Three Kings Islands is pictured.
Waitangi Treaty Grounds historic precinct	A building with wooden Māori-style carvings	Northland	2007	i, ii, iii, iv, vi (cultural)	The site comprises buildings related to the history of New Zealand. The Treaty House belonged to James Busby and was the site of the meetings between the British and the Māori, which resulted in the Declaration of the Independence of New Zealand in 1835. In 1840, the Treaty of Waitangi was signed here. The house was renovated and modified in the 1930s for the centennial, however, the modifications were removed in 1989 and the building was restored to the original setting. The Māori meeting house Te Whare Runanga (pictured) was built in 1939, also for the centennial celebrations.
