= Henry Tacy Kemp =

New Zealand author and translator (1821–1901)

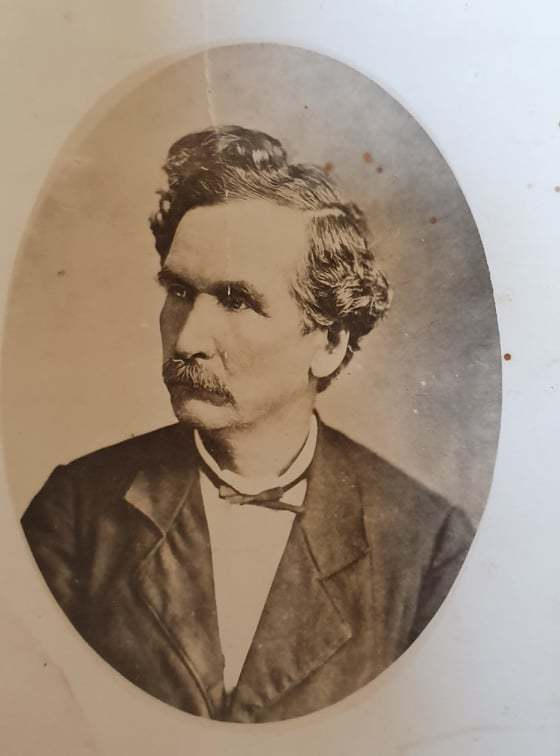
- Born: Kerikeri
- Baptised: 11 February 1821
- Died: 1901; Onehunga
- Notable work: First Step to Maori Conversation (1848); Revised Narrative of Incidents & Events in the Early Colonizing History of New Zealand (1901)
- Father: James Kemp

Henry Tacy Kemp (1821–1901) was a New Zealand author, translator, and civil servant who was responsible for many land purchases in New Zealand, including Canterbury and Kawakawa.

Kemp was praised for his fluency in the Māori language and the government had him translate English literature into Māori to help with their integration into British society.

== Early life ==
Henry Tacy Kemp was born in 1821 (baptised 11 February) to James Kemp. James was a blacksmith at Samuel Marsden's mission and later became proprietor of the Stone Store. Kemp was named after Henry Tacy, curate of Wymondham. James Kemp had been educated at Wymondham Grammar. The mission at Kerikeri had begun teaching in both Māori and English and Kemp became bilingual at a young age.

In 1834 Kemp was sent to the Pottersgate Academy in Norwich, England. He went alongside William Yate and studied for 2–3 years, he was to train as a surgeon but ran out of funds necessitating an early return to New Zealand. By 1837 he was back in Kerikeri helping his father with the Stone Store.

== Land purchases ==
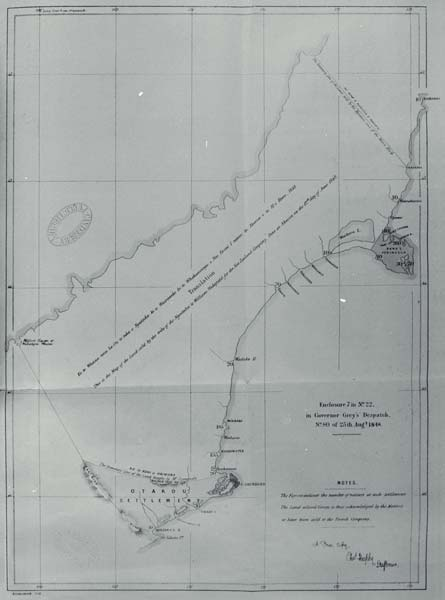
The Canterbury purchase

Kemp's bilingualism led him to become an interpreter and on 6 February 1840, he was gazetted as an Officer of the Government. Kemp prepared a translation of the Treaty of Waitangi. Kemp was promoted to Protector of Aborigines for New Ulster. In 1846 the Department of the Protector of Aborigines was replaced with the Office of Native Secretary. Kemp was made Private Secretary of the office and in 1847 he was promoted to Native Secretary and Interpreter.

Kemp was mostly involved in acquiring land from various Māori peoples for The Crown. In 1848 Kemp purchased approximately 20,000,000 acres (8,100,000 ha) of land in the South Island for £2,000, this land would become Canterbury. The purchase is known as Kemp's Deed. Kemp also purchased land in Auckland, and the Wairarapa. In 1861, Kemp negotiated the purchase of 24,000 acres (9,700 ha) from Māori around what is now Kawakawa in his role as District Land Commissioner.

== Literary works ==
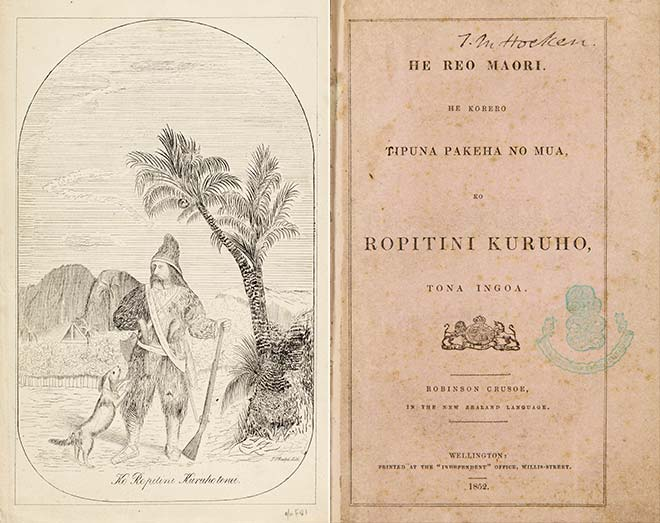
Kemp's translation of Robinson Crusoe

In 1848 Kemp published his English—Māori phrasebook First Step to Maori Conversation. This was Kemp's most successful work and had four editions.

Kemp's third translation was Richard Whately's Easy Lessons on Money Matters, for the Use of Young People. George Grey chose to have this translated, possibly influenced by Whately being a former teacher of Grey. Despite the governor's interest this translation was not successful. Kemp recalled that he told Grey—before publication—that the work was "entirely beyond the grasp of Maori Intelect [sic]".

Kemp got approval from Grey to have Robinson Crusoe (1852) and Pilgrim's Progress translated into Māori. The works were likely viewed as factual instead of fiction by the Māori who read them. Kemp worked on revising his translation for both works but died before he could finish them. Kemp's works were disseminated through the Office of the Native Secretary and government-funded schools. Kemp later in the same year translated Archdeacon Brown's Memorials of an only son, which reflects on the death of Brown's 14-year-old son. This translation was likely due to Grey's sympathy for Brown's loss and the work does not appear to have been popular contemporary nor today. The translations of Robinson Crusoe and Pilgrim's Progress were more popular, with the newspaper The New Zealand Spectator and Cook’s Strait Guardian writing a review that stated:

the book now before us has been received by the natives with intense interest, and in proof of this, and of the sound judgment with which the selection of the work has been made, we may relate an incident which occurred in the Colonial Hospital. The copy of the work sent there wholly engrossed the attention of the natives, the best reader was selected to read aloud while other Maories formed a circle of most attentive listeners, they could hardly be persuaded to allow the lights to be put out at night, and the next morning as soon as there was sufficient light the reading of the interesting story was resumed.

== Later life ==
Changes in government direction to promote English language education instead of Māori language education resulted in Kemp taking on a less important role. In 1865 the Land Purchase Department was disestablished, and Kemp was not given a different role. Kemp alleged Walter Mantell was responsible for ensuring Kemp did not receive a new position, due to a scandal involving Mantell and a Māori woman that Kemp had shed light on. Kemp later worked as Civil Commissioner for Auckland from 1870 to 1880. Kemp had repeatedly applied for a pension on the basis of his 40 year-long civil service, and even petitioned Parliament; however, Kemp was repeatedly denied a pension. Kemp spent the last years of his life in Onehunga with his family until he died from pneumonia in October 1901.

== Legacy ==
Kemp's letters and journals from his time in England are held by the Auckland War Memorial Museum. Kemp's unfinished revision of his translation of Robinson Crusoe and Pilgrim's Progress are held by Auckland Libraries as part of the George Grey Special Collection, alongside First Step to Maori Conversation (1848) and Revised Narrative of Incidents & Events in the Early Colonizing History of New Zealand (1901).

Kemp's knowledge of the Māori language has been praised by both contemporaries and modern academics: Henry Sewell referred to Kemp as 'the best native linguist'.

== Bibliography ==
Original works

- First Steps in Maori Conversation (1848)
- Revised narrative of incidents & events in the early colonizing history of New Zealand, from 1840 to 1880. (1901)

Translations

- Advice on health matters (1848)
- Easy Lessons on Money Matters, for the Use of Young People (1851)
- Robinson Crusoe (1852)
- Pilgrim's Progress (1854)
- Brief memorials of an only son (1854)
