= Rainbow Falls (Waianiwaniwa) =

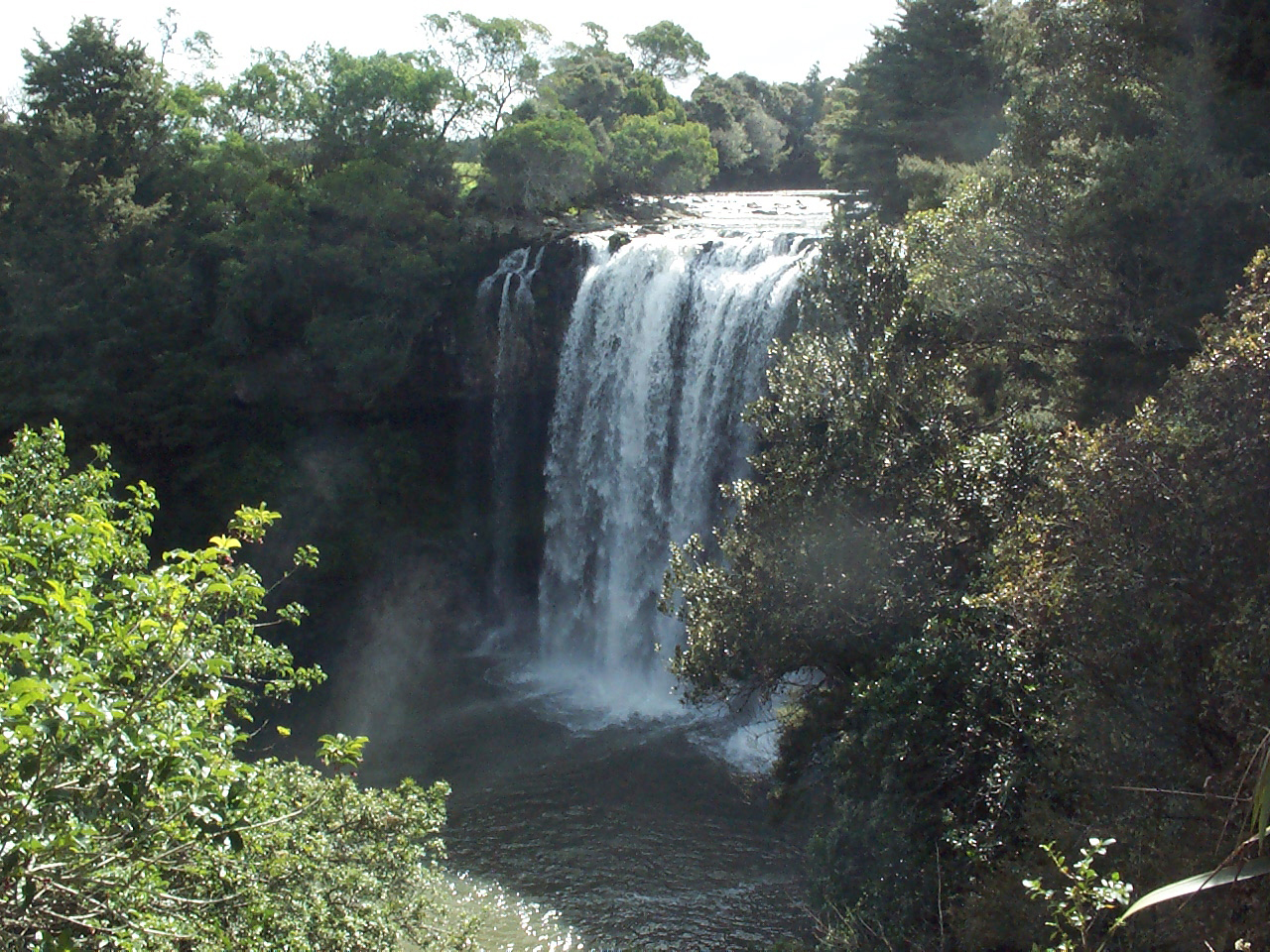
- Rainbow Falls (Waianiwaniwa)
- Interactive map of Rainbow Falls (Waianiwaniwa)
- Location: Kerikeri, New Zealand
- Coordinates: 35.214591°S 173.94216°E
- Type: Plunge
- Total height: 27 m (89 ft)
- Watercourse: Kerikeri River

The Rainbow Falls, Māori name Waianiwaniwa, (Waters of the Rainbow), are a single-drop waterfall located on the Kerikeri River near Kerikeri in New Zealand.

Unlike most New Zealand waterfalls which are created by the erosion of soft rock, the Rainbow Falls are sited on a hard basalt layer of rock beside softer mudstone. The falls were formed when water eroded the mudstone. The 27 metre waterfall is popular with tourists and is regularly photographed from an adjoining Department of Conservation area.

The New Zealand Ministry for Culture and Heritage gives a translation of "rainbow waters" for Waianiwaniwa.

The Rainbow Falls Walk is along a track which takes about 10 minutes to traverse to connect to the Kerikeri River Track which is about 3.5 km long and takes about 1.5 hours to walk. It leads to the Kerikeri Basin where Kerikeri's old buildings are sited, the Stone Store, Mission House and St James Church, plus Rewa's Village and historic Kororipo Pa. The track follows the north bank of the River and passes through kiwi habitat and regenerating native trees such as stands of young kauri and tōtara.

== See also ==
- List of waterfalls
- List of waterfalls of New Zealand
