= Kemp's Deed =

New Zealand legal document

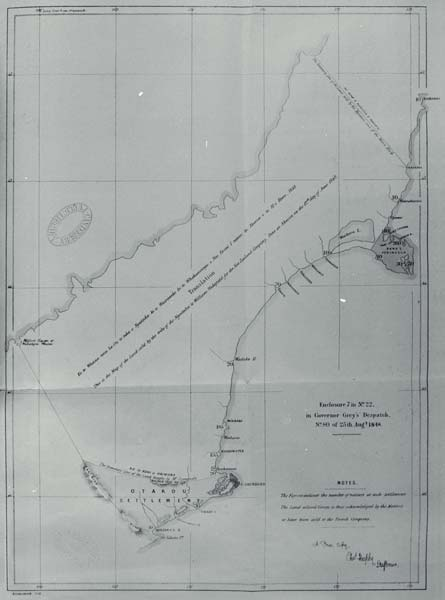
Map showing the boundaries of the Canterbury Purchase

Kemp's Deed, was a contract signed on 12 June 1848 by Tacy Kemp, representing the New Zealand Company on behalf of the British Crown, and 40 leading Māori of the Ngāi Tahu iwi. It was the basis of the Canterbury Purchase, on the South Island. Kemp did not properly follow his instructions, for which he was taken to task by E. J. Eyre, the lieutenant-governor of New Munster (the South Island). Resulting Ngāi Tahu grievances were settled 150 years later with the passing of the Ngāi Tahu Claims Settlement Act 1998 and a compensation package valued at NZ$170 million.

== Background ==
In February 1848, Governor George Grey visited Banks Peninsula and learned that some of the Māori chiefs were prepared to sell the land south of the Ashley River / Rakahuri. The land north of the Ashley River had been sold by Te Rauparaha of Ngāti Toa to the Crown in 1847. Whilst Te Rauparaha had conquered that land between 1828 and 1832, some of it had gone back into use by Ngāi Tahu.

Grey instructed the Lieutenant-Governor of the New Munster Province, Edward John Eyre, with organising the purchase. Grey set aside £2,000 for this purpose, to be paid out in four annual instalments of one quarter of the total sum. Grey considered that given the low number of Māori who were living in Canterbury, this would be "as large an amount as they could profitably spend or as was likely to be of any real benefit to them". He also stipulated that reserves be set aside for Māori of "ample portions for their present and prospective wants" and that after the boundaries of such reserves had been defined, the remainder of the land was to be purchased.

== Kemp's Deed ==
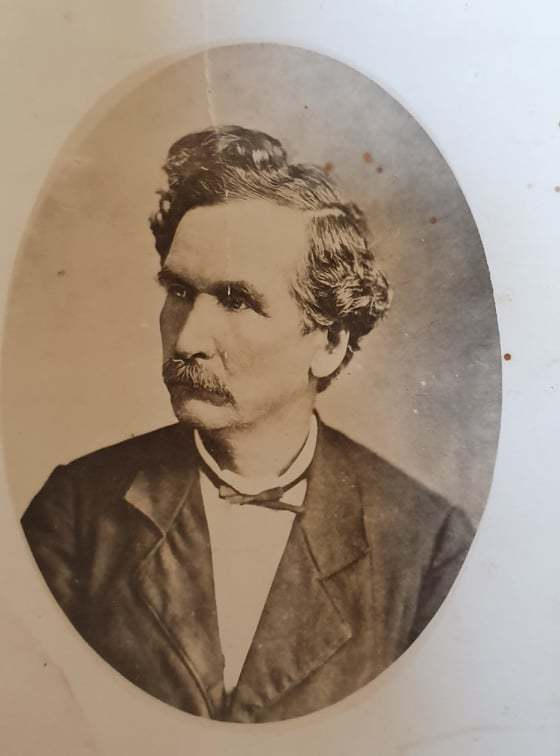
Tacy Kemp

Eyre briefed Tacy Kemp, who at the time was Assistant Protector of Aborigines, with executing the land purchase. Kemp was the New Zealand-born son of the missionaries Charlotte and James Kemp. Tacy Kemp was accompanied by the surveyor Charles Kettle, whose role it was to define the Māori reserves. Kemp and Kettle sailed to Akaroa Harbour where they called a meeting of Māori chiefs. After just three days of negotiations at Akaroa, 16 or 40 chiefs (sources differ) signed what became known as Kemp's Deed on 12 June 1848. The land purchase extended from the Ashley River in the north to the previously purchased Otago Block in the south at the Waitaki River, and from the east coast to the west coast. Banks Peninsula was excluded from the purchase due to the earlier purchase by the Nanto-Bordelaise Company.

When Kemp returned to Wellington to report to Eyre, the Lieutenant-Governor was deeply concerned, as Kemp had not followed his instructions. He was to have surveyed the reserves before the purchase, which is why Kettle accompanied him, but that had not happened. Kemp had not travelled across the land and therefore had not been able to identify where such reserves needed to be established. Due to the brevity of time that he had spent in Akaroa, it was clear that many chiefs would not have been aware that their land had been sold. And the payment terms resulted in a cash flow problem for Eyre.

Eyre foresaw ongoing problems with Māori and to remedy the situation, he instructed land purchase commissioner Walter Mantell and surveyor Alfred Wills to define the native reserves after the winter. Māori chiefs north of the Waimakariri River disputed that their land had ever been sold and demanded a corridor 8 miles (13 km) wide along the Waimakariri all the way to the Southern Alps, plus all the coastal land between the Waimakariri and the Ashley. Mantell granted them a reserve of 2,560 acres (1,040 ha) at Tuahiwi, the pa site at Kaiapoi, and 5 acres (2.0 ha) at a pa on the north bank of the Waimakariri. South of that river, reserves set aside were at Taumutu near the outlet of Lake Ellesmere / Te Waihora (80 acres or 32 hectares), at Arowhenua (south of Temuka; 376 acres or 152 hectares), on the Temuka River (Te Umu Kaha River; 204 acres or 83 hectares), at Caroline Bay (later part of Timaru; 20 acres or 8.1 hectares), and on the north bank of the Waitaki River (13 acres or 5.3 hectares). The work was carried out in August and September 1848 and excluded Banks Peninsula.

== Banks Peninsula ==
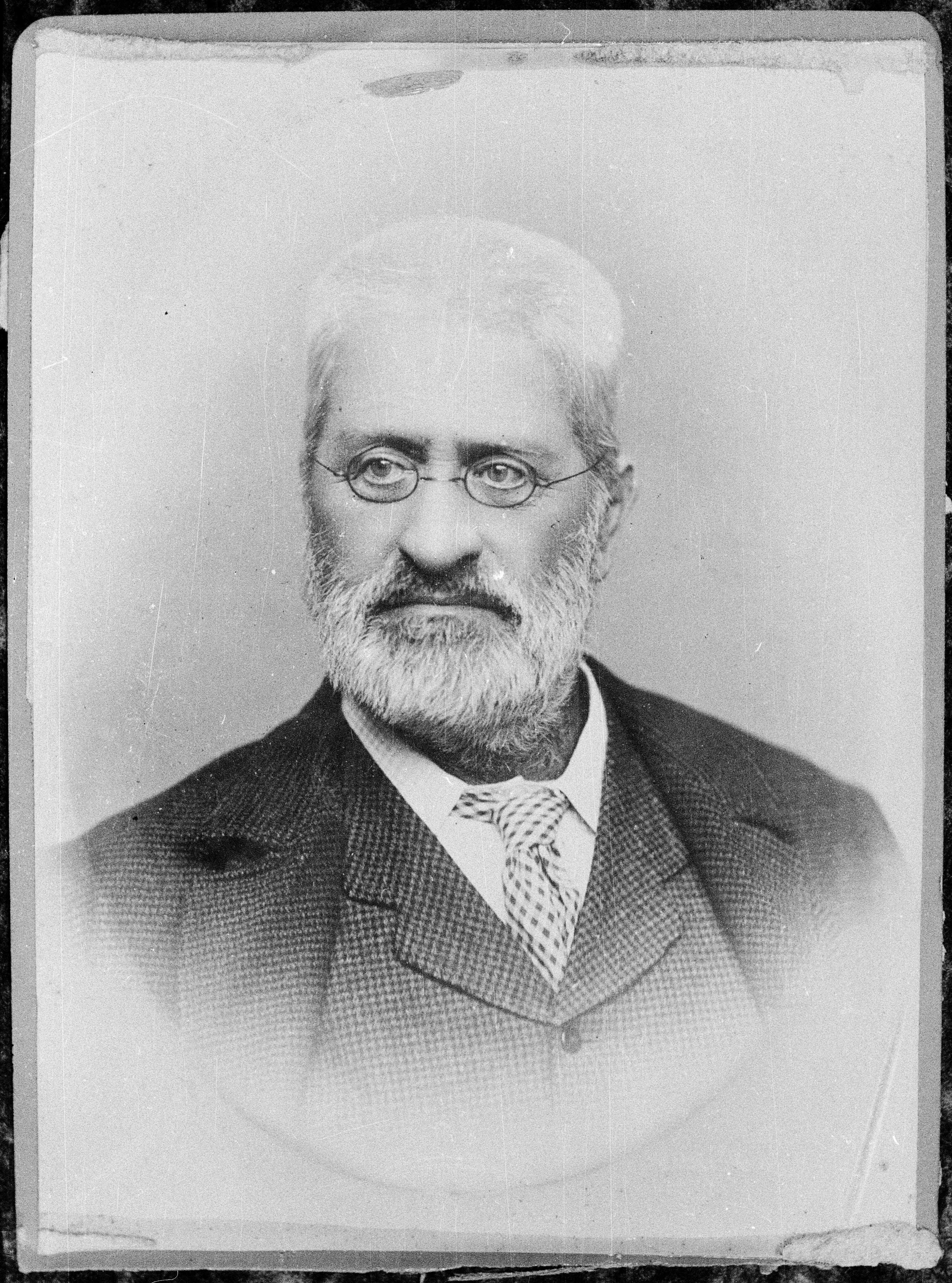
Walter Mantell in c. 1870

From the Crown's perspective, the Canterbury land purchase was resolved with Mantell's work. In 1849, however, it became apparent that the Canterbury Association would choose the plains inland from Banks Peninsula for their settlement, and only Lyttelton Harbour was viable for that settlement. It therefore became urgent to make a determination as to the 1838 land purchase by the Nanto-Bordelaise Company. Grey decided that Port Cooper (i.e. Lyttelton Harbour) and Port Levy were to be excluded from the French purchase and only Akaroa and Pigeon Bay allocated to the French, until such time as a final determination could be made. Mantell was again tasked with settling the matter and after lengthy negotiations, he achieved settlement for the Port Cooper district (59,000 acres or 24,000 hectares) and the Port Levy district (an area of 121,000 acres or 49,000 hectares; far larger than Port Levy itself and including all eastern bays of Banks Peninsula including Pigeon Bay). Mantell paid £200 for the Port Cooper district and granted reserves at Rāpaki (860 acres or 350 hectares) and Purau (10 acres or 4.0 hectares). For the Port Levy district, he paid £300 and granted a reserve of 1,340 acres (540 ha). Those two districts made up about two-thirds of Banks Peninsula.

Mantell failed to get agreement on the Akaroa district, i.e. the remaining part of the peninsula. While Māori did agree with a square block of 30,000 acres (12,000 ha) for the French, none of the other aspects were agreed to. The land around Little River, the southern bays, and the south side of Akaroa Harbour thus remained unresolved. Kemp considered that Māori had already ceded the land to the French anyway, and all that needed doing was to define their reserves, but that was not accepted despite a cash offer of £150. The principal disagreement was about Mantell's plan to consolidate several land claims by different hapu (subtribe) at Ōnuku, a concept that contravened Māori culture and customs.

The Crown walked away from the negotiations and seemed in no urgency to come back to the issue; the main objective of providing a harbour for the Canterbury Association settlement had been met. When the British parliament in London passed the Canterbury Land Settlement Act 1850, the unresolved status of the Akaroa district was not known. After the First Four Ships had arrived, problems arose when the first white settlers chose land in Little River, with Māori objecting to it. The Resident Agent of the Canterbury Association, John Robert Godley, exclaimed:

This information has taken me completely by surprise, as it has always been understood by the Canterbury Association that the Crown was in possession of the whole district which they [the Canterbury Association] have been empowered to dispose of and convey. The Canterbury Settlement Act is evidently founded on the hypothesis that such is the fact.

Governor Grey responded to the problem by stating that it could quickly be resolved and all that needed to happen was for the Canterbury Association to pay £200 for agreements that had already been reached. But Grey was mistaken, as Mantell's offer for reserves had never been accepted by Māori, and counter-claims by Māori had in turn not been accepted by Mantell. The issue was ignored for several more years until J. Grant Johnson was asked in 1856 by the native land purchase commissioner, Donald McLean, to try and settle the issue. Johnson, after a thorough investigation, concluded that Māori had never ceded the Akaroa block, and his offer of £200 and three reserves of 400 acres (160 ha) each at Ōnuku, Little River and Wainui was accepted.

== Further settlements ==
William John Warburton Hamilton was asked in early 1857 to respond to Ngāi Tahu claims that they were the owners of land north of the Ashley River that Ngāti Toa had wrongly been paid for, and should have instead been included in Kemp's Deed. Hamilton agreed with that claim and paid £400 for land extending 50 miles (80 km) north from the Ashley River in February 1859. Hamilton brought to the attention of the Crown that two other areas required resolution: Kaikōura (also north of the Ashley River) and the West Coast of the Canterbury Purchase. The Kaikōura claim was settled in March 1859 for £300 and 5,566 acres (2,252 ha) in reserves. On the West Coast, settlement was reached in May 1860 for £300 and 6,724 acres (2,721 ha) in individual reserves, and 3,500 acres (1,400 ha) in general reserves.

== Outcomes ==
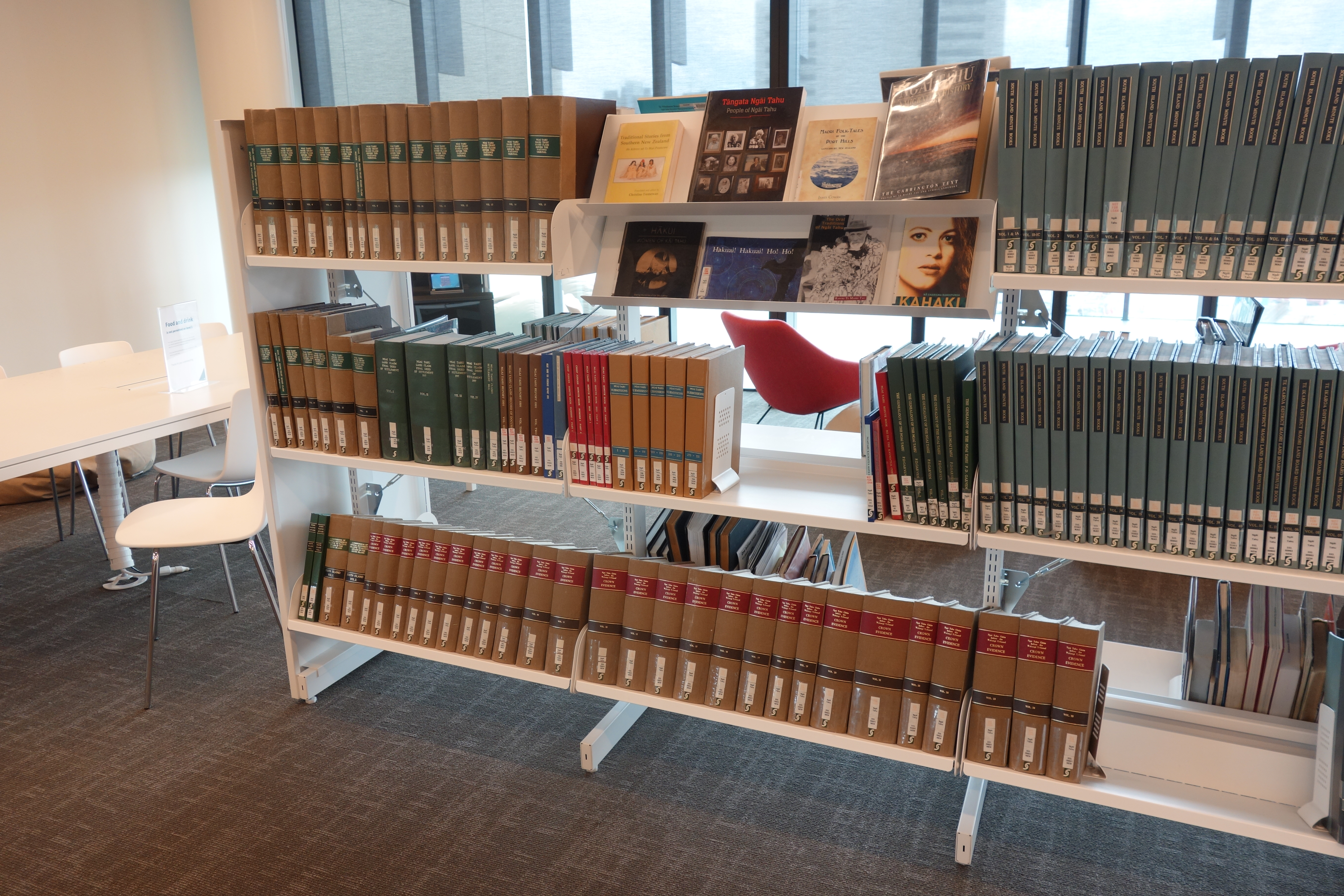
Documents held at Tūranga in relation to the 1980s land settlement claim

The land granted in reserves was significantly too small for Māori to sustain themselves with their traditional food-gathering lifestyle. Even if Māori had understood European farming methods, which they did not, they would not have had enough land to sustain themselves. Living standards of Māori deteriorated and many became destitute. This process was delayed at Tuahiwi, where Māori could gain income from cutting down their forest, but once the timber had been sold off they faced the same problems. In the following decades, Ngāi Tahu made claims to parliament that the Crown had failed them.

A full investigation was undertaken in 1920 and it was found that Grey's promise of meeting "present and prospective wants" had not been fulfilled, neither by Kemp nor Mantell. There had also been promises of hospitals, schools, and general care that were never acted on. As it was no longer possible to compensate in land, a commission developed a formula for monetary compensation based on what the Crown had paid for the Otago Block. Including interest and costs for presenting their claim, the commission recommended that £354,000 be paid to Ngāi Tahu. The commissioners found that Ngāi Tahu's grievance "was created in the first instance out of misconception, prolonged through misunderstanding, and magnified by neglect". In 1925, a Native Land Court determined a list of persons between whom this payment should be split but nothing further happened for two decades, as the Crown considered the amount as too high and Ngāi Tahu rejected it as insufficient.

In 1944, the Ngai-tahu Claim Settlement Act provided for an annual payment of £10,000 for 30 years to a Ngāi Tahu Trust Board. Ngāi Tahu was not involved in settling this claim until after the legislation had been passed. Much of the income from this source was used by Ngāi Tahu to take their claim to the Waitangi Tribunal in 1986. The tribunal heard the claim for two years—throughout 1987 and 1988—and issued its report in 1991. One of the core findings was that "the Crown [had] acted unconscionably and in repeated breach of the Treaty of Waitangi", and it recommended compensation. Negotiations for settlement took several years and were concluded in 1998, almost 150 years after the grievance was first caused, and was put into law through the Ngāi Tahu Claims Settlement Act 1998. The deed of settlement was valued at NZ$170 million, included the transfer of ownership of pounamu to the tribe, resulted in the renaming of many settlements and geographic items, and an "unreserved" apology from the Crown. The Crown gave back the tribe's sacred mountain, Aoraki / Mount Cook, and in a symbolic gesture the tribe gifted it back to the nation.
