= Puketotara, Northland =

Populated area in New Zealand

Puketotara
- Interactive map of Puketotara
- Coordinates: 35.224°S 173.921°E
- Country: New Zealand
- Region: Northland Region
- District: Far North District
- Ward: Bay of Islands/Whangaroa
- Community: Bay of Islands-Whangaroa
- Subdivision: Waipapa
- Electorates: Northland; Te Tai Tokerau

Government
  - Territorial Authority: Far North District Council
  - Regional council: Northland Regional Council
  - Mayor of Far North: Moko Tepania
  - Northland MP: Grant McCallum
  - Te Tai Tokerau MP: TBD

Area
  - Total: 55.27 km^{2} (21.34 sq mi)

Population (June 2025)June 2025
  - Total: 2,060
  - Density: 37.3/km^{2} (96.5/sq mi)

Puketotara is a statistical area in the Far North District of New Zealand. It covers 55 square kilometres around Puketōtara Stream. There are no population centres in the area, with Waipapa being to the northeast, Kerikeri to the east, Waimate North to the south, and Ōkaihau to the southwest. Kerikeri Airport is within the area, and State Highway 10 runs mostly north–south through it. Rainbow Falls (Waianiwaniwa) is on the eastern boundary.

== Demographics ==
Puketotara covers 55.27 km^{2} (21.34 sq mi) and had an estimated population of 2,060 as of June 2025, with a population density of 37 people per km^{2}.

Historical population
Year	Pop.	±% p.a.
2006	1,293	—
2013	1,380	+0.93%
2018	1,677	+3.98%
2023	2,007	+3.66%

Puketotara had a population of 2,007 in the 2023 New Zealand census, an increase of 330 people (19.7%) since the 2018 census, and an increase of 627 people (45.4%) since the 2013 census. There were 999 males, 999 females and 6 people of other genders in 672 dwellings. 2.2% of people identified as LGBTIQ+. The median age was 45.5 years (compared with 38.1 years nationally). There were 363 people (18.1%) aged under 15 years, 294 (14.6%) aged 15 to 29, 957 (47.7%) aged 30 to 64, and 390 (19.4%) aged 65 or older.

People could identify as more than one ethnicity. The results were 87.7% European (Pākehā); 21.2% Māori; 3.6% Pasifika; 3.0% Asian; 1.8% Middle Eastern, Latin American and African New Zealanders (MELAA); and 2.4% other, which includes people giving their ethnicity as "New Zealander". English was spoken by 97.8%, Māori language by 3.7%, Samoan by 0.1% and other languages by 9.7%. No language could be spoken by 1.6% (e.g. too young to talk). New Zealand Sign Language was known by 0.4%. The percentage of people born overseas was 23.8, compared with 28.8% nationally.

Religious affiliations were 23.0% Christian, 0.1% Hindu, 0.3% Islam, 2.2% Māori religious beliefs, 0.6% Buddhist, 0.4% New Age, 0.1% Jewish, and 1.9% other religions. People who answered that they had no religion were 62.5%, and 8.8% of people did not answer the census question.

Of those at least 15 years old, 237 (14.4%) people had a bachelor's or higher degree, 933 (56.8%) had a post-high school certificate or diploma, and 378 (23.0%) people exclusively held high school qualifications. The median income was $38,100, compared with $41,500 nationally. 162 people (9.9%) earned over $100,000 compared to 12.1% nationally. The employment status of those at least 15 was that 789 (48.0%) people were employed full-time, 297 (18.1%) were part-time, and 39 (2.4%) were unemployed.
