= Charlotte Kemp =

English missionary (1790–1860)

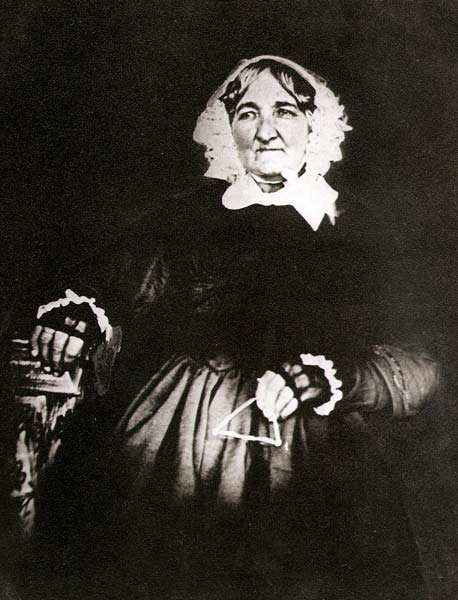
- Born: Charlotte Butcher; 27 July 1790; Carleton Forehoe, Norfolk, England
- Died: 22 June 1860 (aged 69); Kerikeri, New Zealand
- Occupation: Missionary
- Spouse: James Kemp (m. 1818)

Charlotte Kemp (née Butcher, 27 July 1790 – 22 June 1860) was a missionary for the Church of England, co-founding the second Church Mission Station in New Zealand at Kerikeri. Born in England, she came to New Zealand with her husband, James Kemp, in 1819 and settled in Kerikeri where the CMS station was founded. She taught at the station's schools and raised her eight children. One died as an infant and this led to her having a mental breakdown. She recovered and by 1840, she and her husband were the only missionaries in Kerikeri. During the Flagstaff War, they were two of the few Europeans to remain in the area during the conflict. She died in Kerikeri at the age of 70.

== Early life ==
Charlotte Butcher was born on 27 July 1790, in Carleton Forehoe, Norfolk, England. She married James Kemp, a blacksmith, on 16 November 1818 at Wymondham Abbey and then emigrated to New Zealand.

== Missionary work ==
After sailing aboard the Baring to Sydney, in Australia, Kemp and her husband transferred to the General Gates for the trip to the Bay of Islands, their final destination. Arriving on 12 August 1819, they settled in Kerikeri, where she was one of the first European women in the area. Along with Thomas Kendall and John Gare Butler, the Kemps established a Church Missionary Society (CMS) station at Kerikeri. However, Kendall and Butler were soon in argument, making it difficult for the Kemps. At the time of their arrival, the Musket Wars was a constant presence. Nearby was the main pā (fort) of Hongi Hika, a Māori rangatira (chief) of the Ngāpuhi iwi (tribe). Hika often raided neighbouring tribes and brought back slaves, to the dismay of the missionaries. They also had to deal with the threats to their wellbeing and property.

Despite this strain on the missionary community the following years saw the establishment of the first schools. Kemp taught in the girls and infants school, also teaching girls in domestic skills at her own home, while her husband taught at the boys' school, conducted services and ran the CMS store. While at the station she had eight children. In 1835 the death of one of her children at seven months old coincided with a proposed move for the family to establish a new mission station in Tauranga. The stress led to her having a mental breakdown. As a result the family remained in Kerikeri, living at Mission House. She recovered and had another child a few years later but was prone to relapses.

The only missionaries to remain in the area after 1840 and this meant the Kemp family was uniquely situated during the Flagstaff War of 1845–46, being among the few Europeans who stayed in the Bay of Islands during this time. In 1845 they assisted in tending the British wounded from engagements with Ngāpuhi war parties at Ōkaihau and Ōhaeawai. In 1848, the CMS station at Kerikeri was closed. A factor in this was Kemp's health which meant that her husband refused to move to Tūranga, on the East Cape.

Kemp remained at Kerikeri while James Kemp ran the Stone Store. On 22 June 1860, she died following a short illness. Her husband died twelve years later at the age of 75.

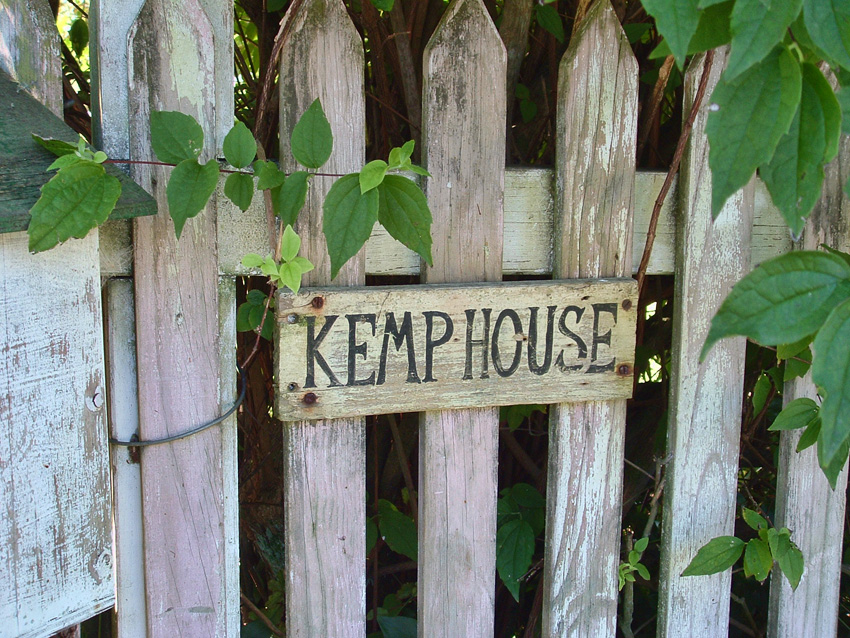
Sign at the gate of the Kemp house in Kerikeri

== Legacy ==
The Kemp residence, Mission House, remained in the family's hands until 1974, when it was donated to the New Zealand Historic Places Trust by her great-grandson. The oldest European building in New Zealand, it was added to the New Zealand Historic Places Category 1 list on 23 June 1983.
