= St James' Church, Kerikeri =

Coordinates: 35°13′06″S 173°57′41″E

St James' Anglican Church
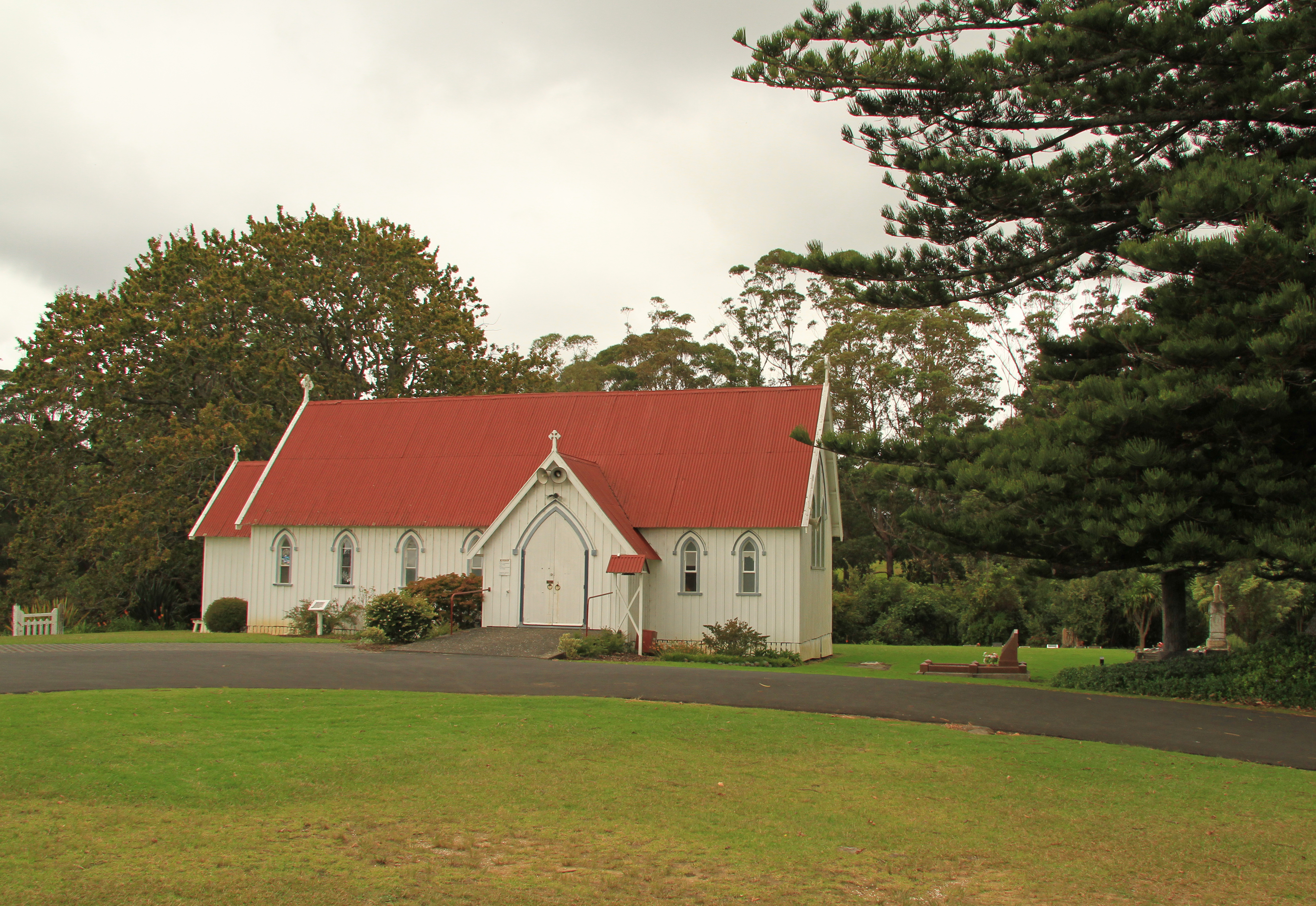
- St James' Anglican Church
- Address: 209 Kerikeri Road, Kerikeri, North Island
- Country: New Zealand
- Denomination: Anglican
- Website: stjameskk.org.nz

History
- Status: Church
- Dedication: James the Great
- Dedicated: 5 December 1878

Architecture
- Functional status: Active
- Architect: Marsden Clarke
- Style: Gothic Revival
- Construction cost: NZ£235

Specifications
- Materials: Kauri weatherboard

Administration
- Diocese: Auckland
- Parish: St Paul's, Whangaroa

Heritage New Zealand – Category 1
- Designated: 6 June 1985
- Reference no.: 68

St James' Anglican Church is an heritage-listed Anglican church located in Kerikeri, in New Zealand's Bay of Islands. The church dates to 1878 and replaced a larger chapel from 1829. Due to the buildings association with the establishment of Christianity and Anglicanism in New Zealand it is registered as a category 1 building with Heritage New Zealand.

== Description ==
St James' Church is a small Gothic Revival kauri timber Latin cross church. The church has a corrugated iron roof, replacing an earlier shingle roof. The church forms part of the Kerikeri Basin historic area alongside the Stone Store and Mission House.

The church is dedicated to St James the Greater of Compostela.

== History ==
The first chapel in Kerikeri was built in 1824 on a different site. In 1829 a Georgian chapel was constructed at the current site that could seat around 200–300. This chapel hosted Hone Heke's marriage ceremony. Kerikeri's importance had diminished in the late-19th century and in 1878 a smaller church was constructed for £235 to a Gothic Revival design from Marsden Clarke. The church was dedicated in December that year by the Archdeacon of Waimate, Edward Clarke.

Initially the church only measured 41 ft (12 m)by 18 ft (5.5 m) and seated just 75 as the Kerikeri congregation had shrunken, although by the 1960s Kerikeri started to grow as a centre of horticulture and in 1963 the nave, porch, and vestry were extended with the chancel being extended in 1969.

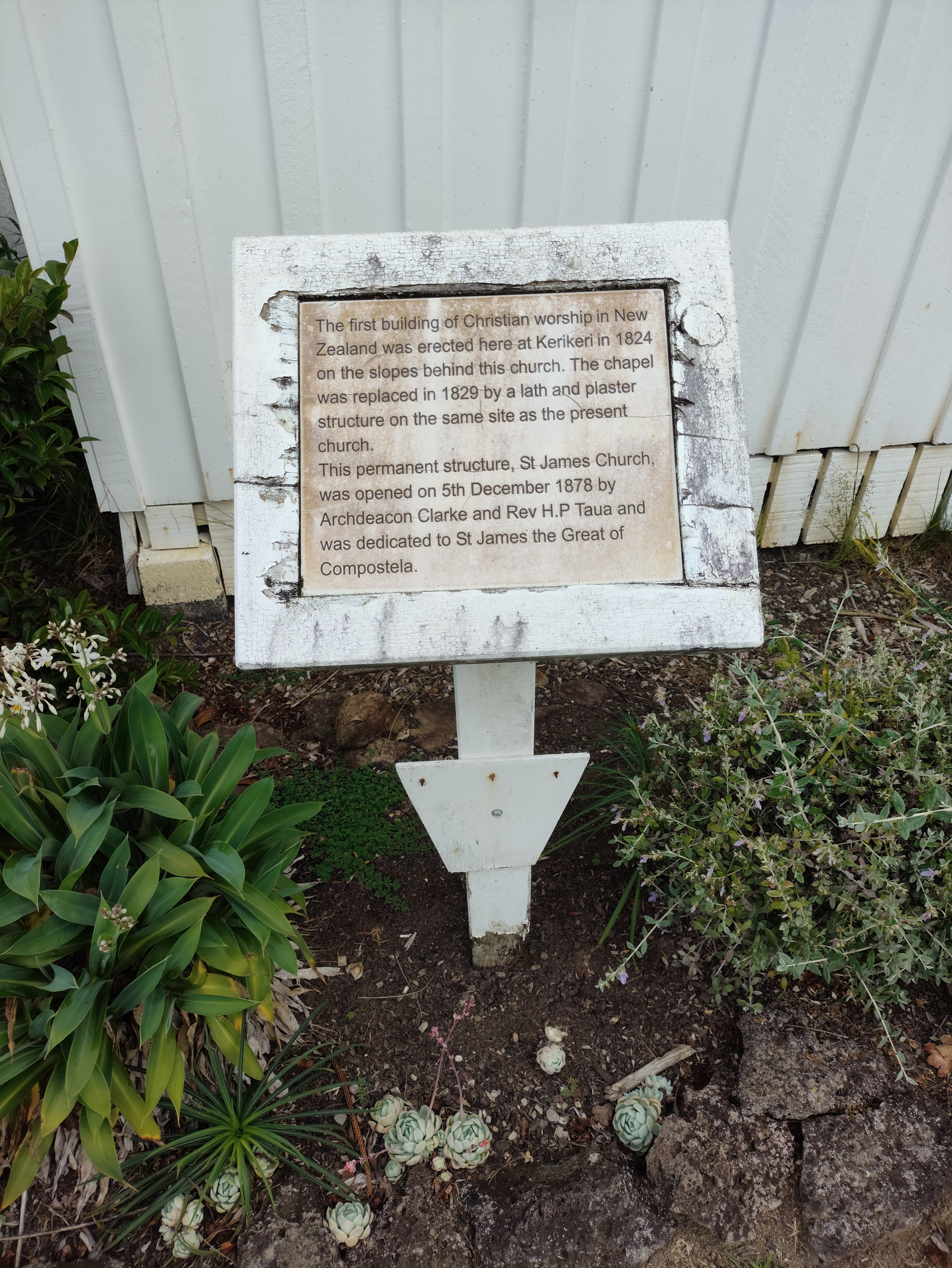
History of the church on a plaque near the church building.

== Cemetery ==
The cemetery of St James is the oldest cemetery still in operation in New Zealand. Several graves are dated before 1840.
