= Kerikeri River =

River in New Zealand

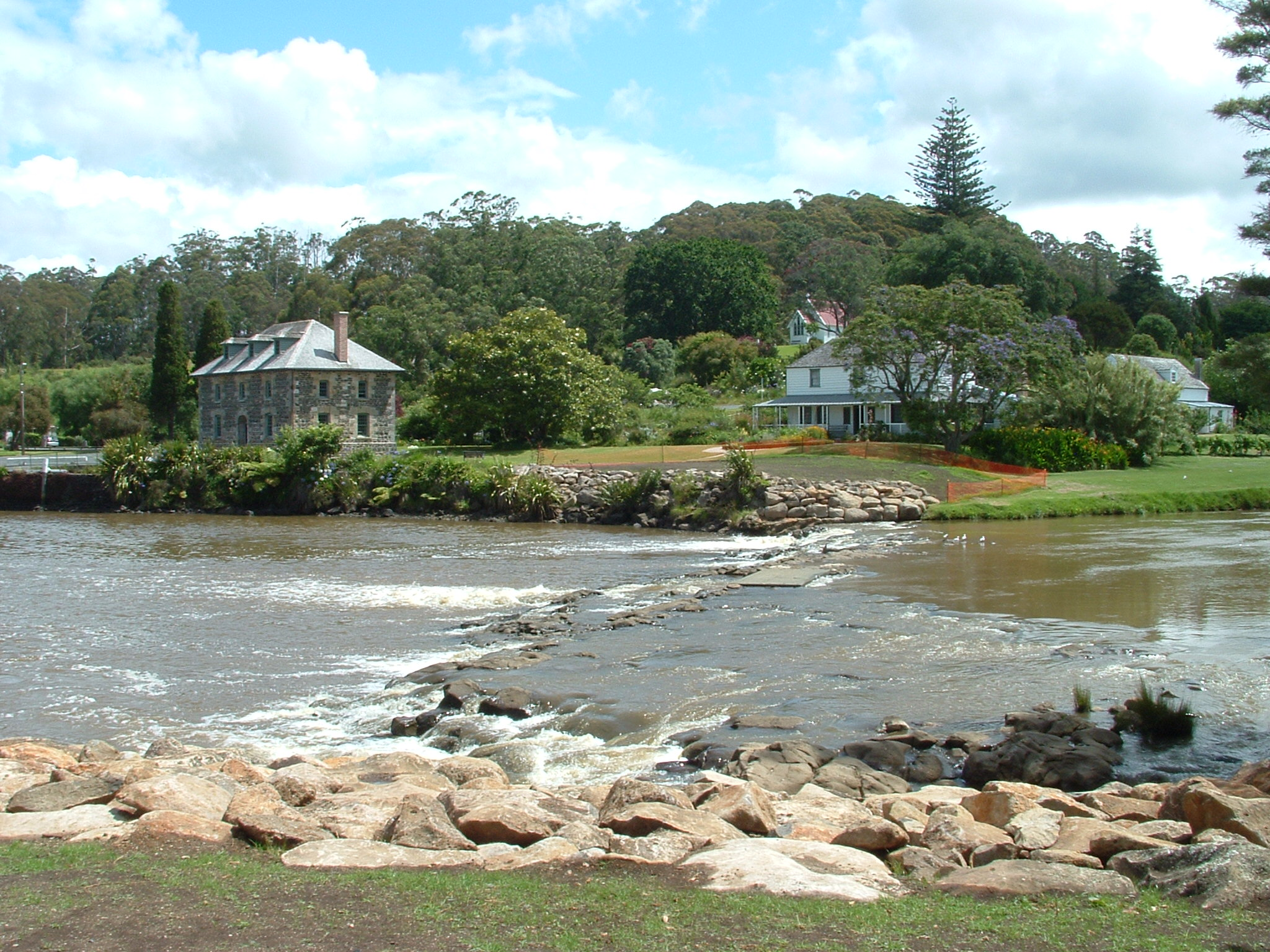
- The Kerikeri River tumbles over a ford into the Kerikeri Basin. Kerikeri's historic buildings are in the background the Stone Store (left), St. James Church (centre rear) and the Mission House
- Native name: Kerikeri (Māori)

Location
- Region: Northland Region
- District: Far North District

Physical characteristics
- Source: Puketi Forest
- Mouth: Bay of Islands
  - coordinates: 35°13′S 173°58′E
- Length: 20 km (12 mi)

Basin features
- Waterfalls: Rainbow Falls (Waianiwaniwa), Wharepoke Falls

The Kerikeri River rises in the Puketi Forest inland from Kerikeri and flows into the western extremity of the Bay of Islands in northern New Zealand. A 7-kilometre (4 mi) long stream flowing into Raglan Harbour in Waikato also has the same name but it is unofficial.

Slightly less than 20 kilometres (12 mi) long, the Northland river is hardly a significant waterway, but because it terminates at one of the most important historic sites in the country, the Kerikeri Basin, adjacent to the Stone Store.

The freshwater river falls over a ford into the Kerikeri Basin, the upper extremity of Kerikeri Inlet, a northwestern arm of the Bay. The ford replaced a bridge which crossed at that point for decades, but which needed to be demolished to protect Kerikeri's historic buildings in the basin.

A replacement bypass bridge was constructed several hundred metres upstream and opened in 2008. A pedestrian bridge was constructed around 2010, 200 metres (660 ft) upstream from the ford.

The area is one of the most visited tourist destinations in the country, because of its history and photogenic buildings. The Stone Store was built in 1832 and is the oldest stone building extant in New Zealand. Adjacent is the Mission House, previously known as "Kemp House", which was built in 1822 and is the oldest surviving wooden house in Australia and New Zealand. Behind, up a hill, is St James' Church which has been on the site since 1829 (although in its current form only since 1878).

Part of the history of the river is that it was used by chief Hongi Hika whose Kororipo Pa is about 100 metres (330 ft) across the basin from the ford. Hongi used the river and tracks beside it to commute to Kororipo, his coastal pā, which played a significant part in the historic Musket Wars.

A popular walking track from the basin leads about five kilometres to the river’s spectacular Rainbow Falls. One of the first hydroelectric power stations in New Zealand was constructed on the river, and remains of it can be seen from the track.
