= Ngāi Tahu Claims Settlement Act 1998 =

Act of Parliament in New Zealand

New Zealand Parliament
- Long title: (a) to record the apology given by the Crown to Ngāi Tahu in the deed of settlement executed on 21 November 1997 by the then Prime Minister the Right Honourable James Brendan Bolger, for the Crown, and Te Rūnanga o Ngāi Tahu; and (b) to give effect to certain provisions of that deed of settlement, being a deed that settles the Ngāi Tahu claims
- Royal assent: 1 October 1998
- Status: Current legislation

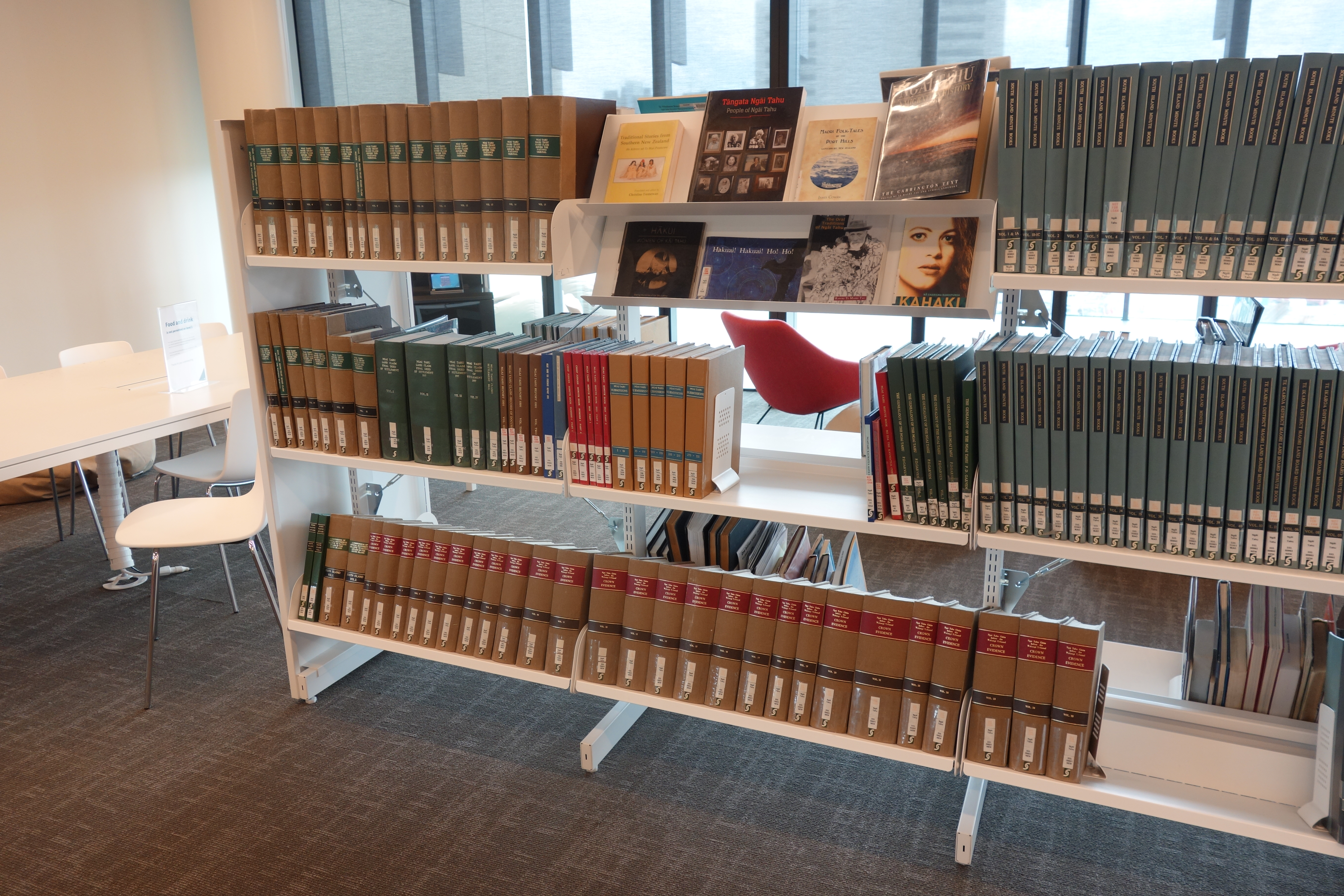
The Ngāi Tahu land settlement claim documents at Tūranga

The Ngāi Tahu Claims Settlement Act 1998 is an act of parliament passed in New Zealand relating to Ngāi Tahu, the principal Māori iwi (tribe) of the South Island. The act's purpose is to settle all of the tribe's claims under the Treaty of Waitangi, and to record an apology to Ngai Tahu from the Crown, in regard to past failures to protect the tribe's interests. The act is administered by the Office of Treaty Settlements.

It was negotiated in part by Henare Rakiihia Tau. The documents in relation to the Ngāi Tahu land settlement claim are held at Tūranga, the main public library in Christchurch.

Schedule 96 "Alteration of place names" contains a list of places that received official name changes to dual English and Māori names, such as Aoraki / Mount Cook.

== Background ==
Between 1844 and 1864, during which time a number of land sales occurred (the biggest being Kemp's Deed in 1848), Ngāi Tahu passed over 34.5 million acres of land to the Crown for a sum of £14,750, or six hundredths of a penny per acre. Without this land, which makes up most of the South Island and more than half the total area of New Zealand, Ngāi Tahu were left without the resources required to provide for their tribe and fell into poverty. For 150 years following this land acquisition, Ngāi Tahu leaders brought forward claims to New Zealand courts arguing that their impoverished conditions reflected the Crown's neglect of its responsibilities outlined in the Treaty of Waitangi, but were repeatedly denied hearing.

== Claims overview ==
Beginning 1986, some 200 grievances were brought forth to the newly established Waitangi Tribunal by Ngāi Tahu claimants. The overarching claim was divided into nine sections called The Nine Tall Trees of Ngāi Tahu, representing eight major land purchases made between 1844–1864 and the ensuing loss of mahinga kai – the resources Ngāi Tahu needed to provide for themselves. The grievances under these headings were directed at the unmet expectations of Ngāi Tahu claimants in accessing education, health, and food resources due to the Crown's failure to keep its promises made in the Treaty of Waitangi.

== Settlement overview ==
In 1998, the Ngāi Tahu Claims Settlement Act passed in Parliament, acknowledging Ngāi Tahu’s hardships as well as committing the Crown to paying $170 million in economic redress. Cultural redress was also negotiated, with the Crown recognising Ngāi Tahu’s traditional kaitiaki (guardian) role in managing and safeguarding resources in the South Island. A formal apology was issued by the Crown, stating that: "The Crown acknowledges that it acted unconscionably and in repeated breach of the principles of the Treaty of Waitangi in its dealings with Ngāi Tahu in the purchases of Ngāi Tahu land". Ngāi Tahu assert that for some, this apology is the most important part of the settlement package.

In addition to being formally included in the act, the apology was delivered in-person by Prime Minister Jenny Shipley in November 1998. Shipley delivered the apology in a speech made at Ōnuku marae, near Akaroa on Banks Peninsula.

== See also ==
- Treaty of Waitangi claims and settlements
