= Kemp House =

Historic residential building

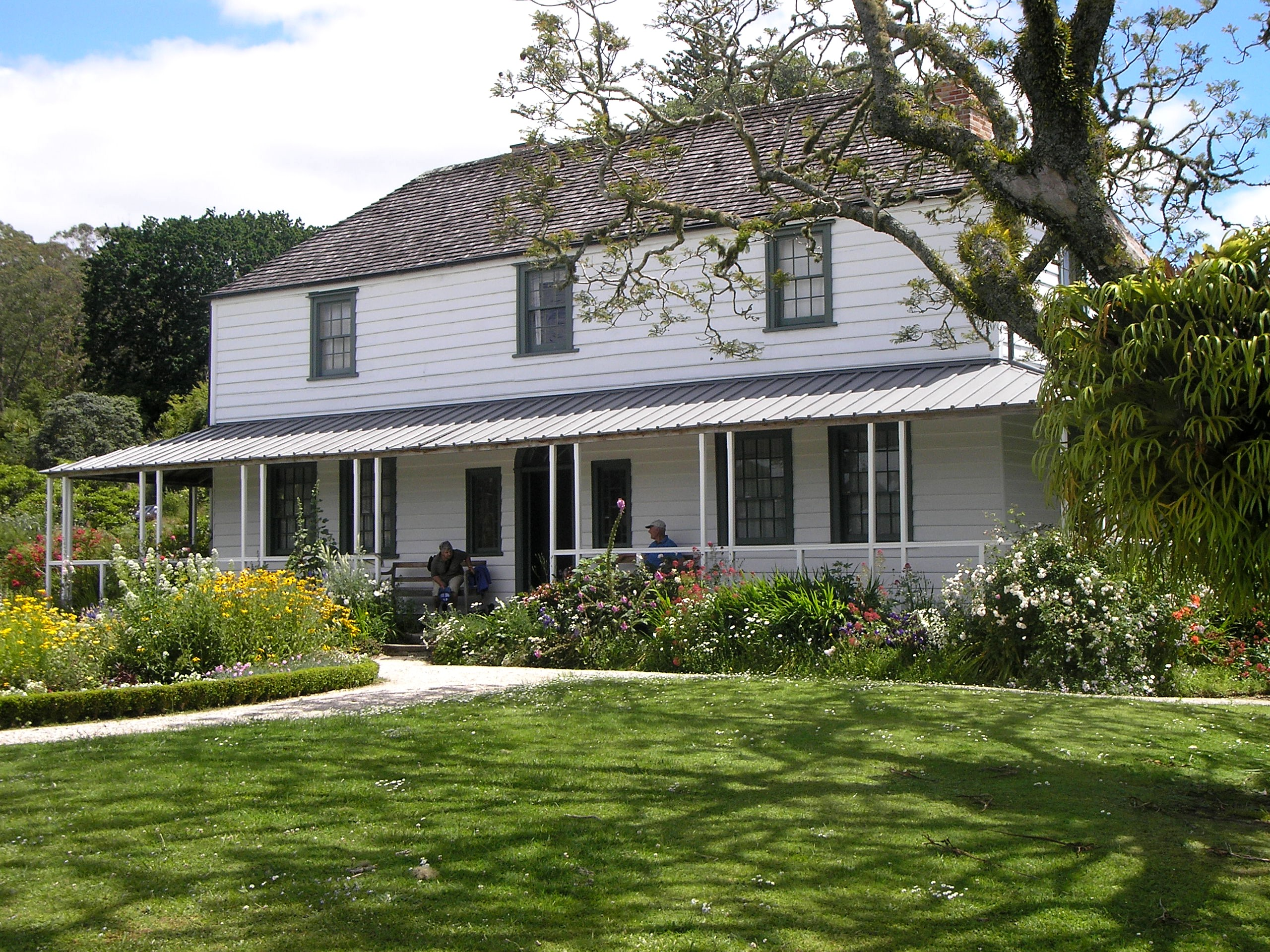
- A view of the front of the mission house at the Kerikeri basin

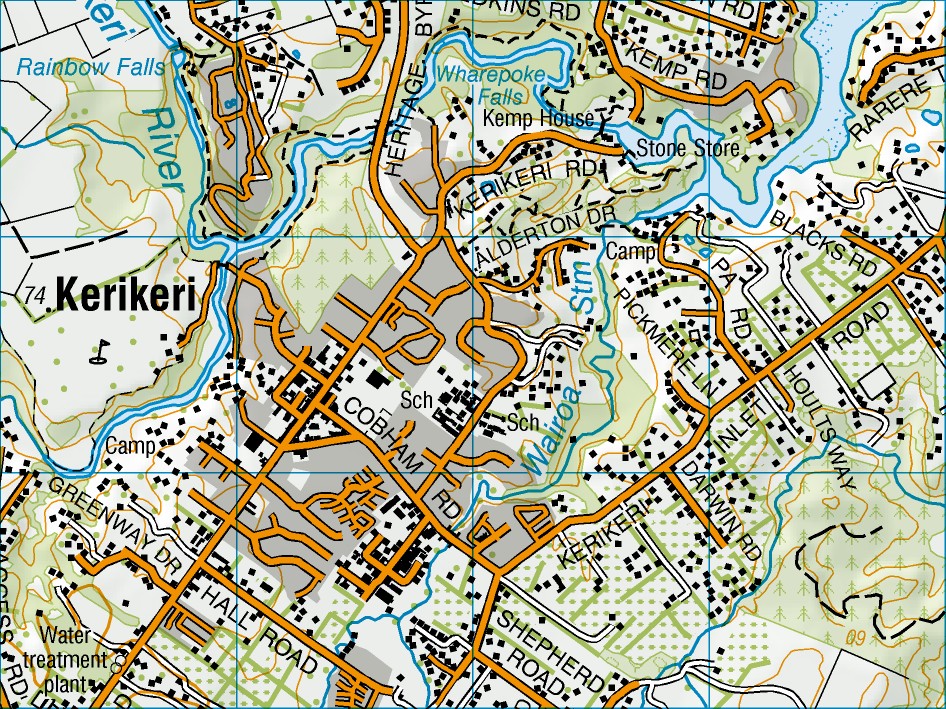
- 35°13′03″S 173°57′44″E
- Location: Kerikeri, Bay of Islands, New Zealand

History
- Built: 1821–1822

Site notes
- Architectural style: Georgian architecture

Heritage New Zealand – Category 1
- Designated: 23 June 1983
- Reference no.: 2

Kemp House, also known as Mission House, is the oldest extant building in New Zealand. The building was built in 1822 as part of the Kerikeri Mission Station by the Church Missionary Society. Kemp House is located in the Kerikeri Basin.

== Description ==
Kemp House is a two-storey Georgian symmetrical building with a hipped shingle roof. Kemp House sits in the Kerikeri Basin facing towards Kororipo pa. It is the oldest extant building in New Zealand dating back to 1822.

== History ==
The Kerikeri Mission was established in 1819 as the second Church Missionary Society (CMS) settlement under the protection of Hongi Hika, an influential tribal leader. The mission house was constructed for the local minister, Reverend John Butler. Maori sawed native timber whilst the mission had carpenters to construct the building. The Mission House stood out amongst the other buildings as being of a greater quality; materials were imported from Australia for the roof.

Butler was dismissed in 1823, various others occupied it until 1832 when it was occupied by James Kemp and his family during the construction of the Stone Store. Kemp's wife, Charlotte, educated the daughters of the local chiefs and in the 1830s a lean-to was added onto the building to house these children as boarders. In 1842 or 1843 the closed verandah was opened up.

In 1848 the Kerikeri Mission wound up operations, due to a declining Māori population following Hongi Hika's departure in 1827 and increasing obsolescence of the settlement in favour of Russell. The Kemp family continued to live at the house, whilst running a gum shop at the Stone Store. The property remained in family hands until 1974 when Ernest Kemp donated it to the National Historic Places Trust (now Heritage New Zealand). A flood in March 1981 damaged part of the ground floor. During restoration work pages from a catechism in the Maori language were discovered, with the work dating back to the 1840s. Kemp House has been managed as a public museum since the Historic Places Trust first acquired the property.

In 2000 two Māori language writing slates dating to the 1830s were discovered at Kemp House. In 2018 the slates were added to the UNESCO New Zealand Memory of the World Register.

== Gallery ==
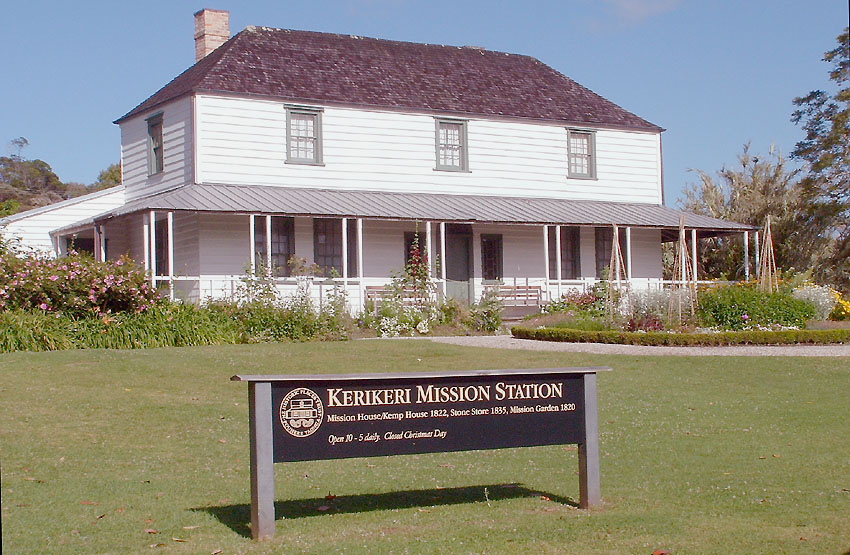
Mission House

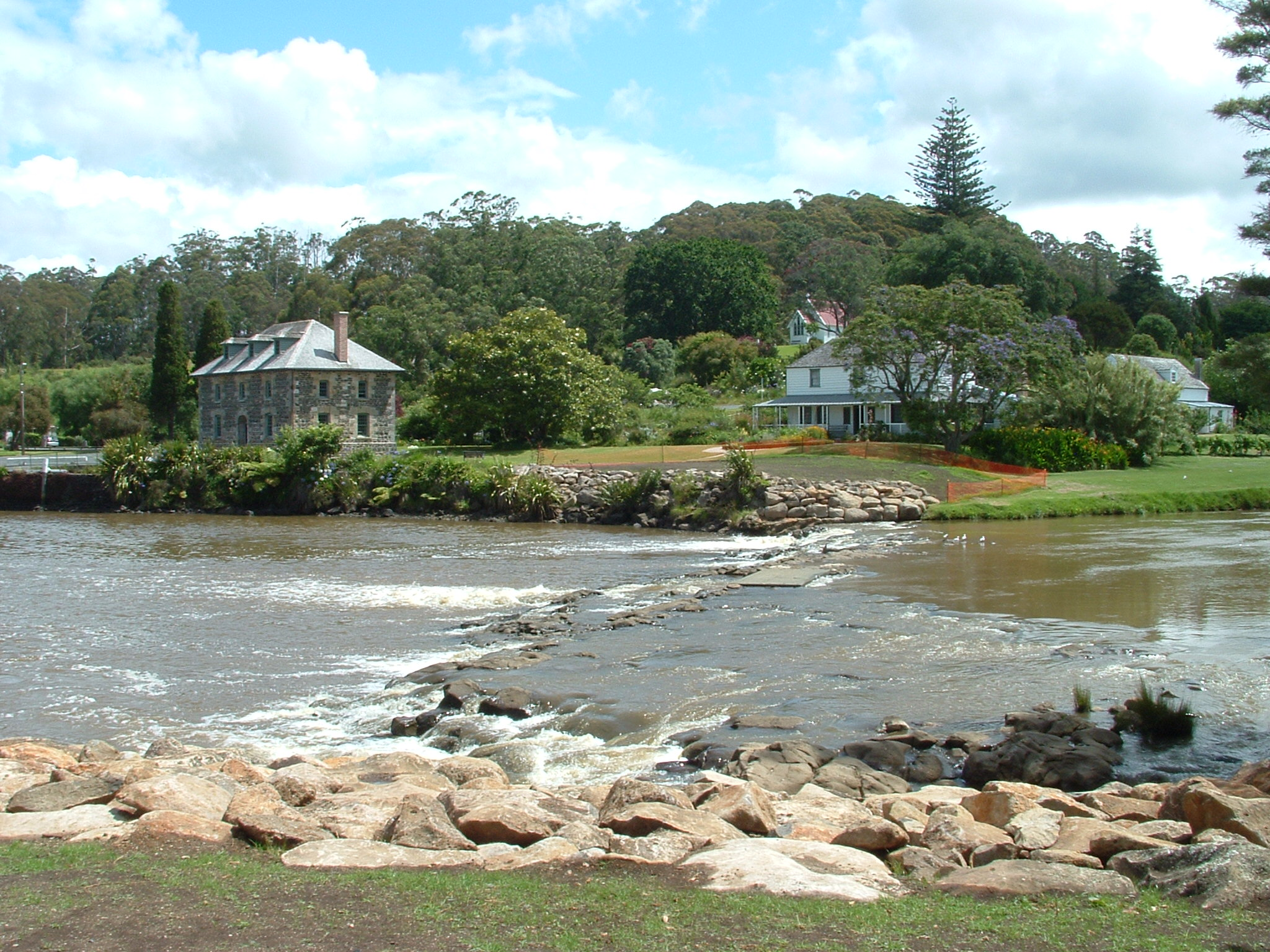
The Kerikeri River (right) and Kerikeri Inlet (left) with the Mission House in the right background. A stone bridge here was removed in 2008.

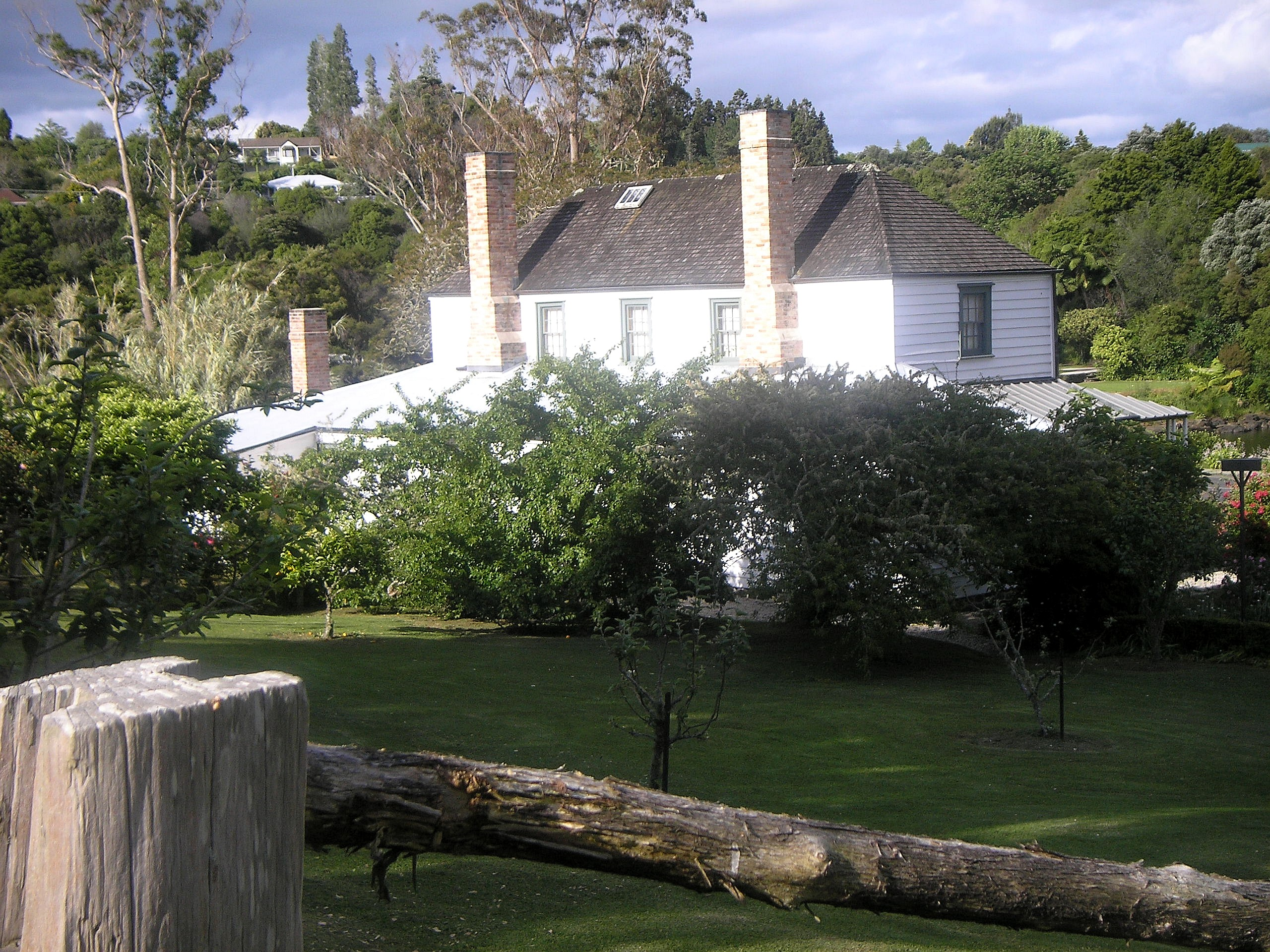
Rear view showing gardens
