= James Kemp (missionary) =

English missionary (1797–1872)

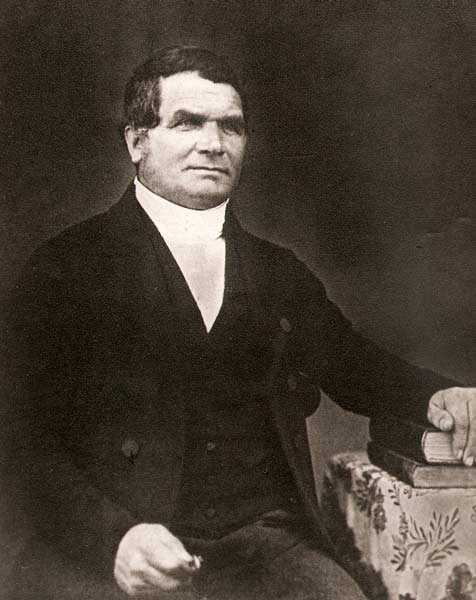
- Born: 7 September 1797; Wymondham, Norfolk, England
- Died: 21 February 1872 (aged 74); Auckland, New Zealand
- Occupations: Blacksmith; Missionary
- Spouse: Charlotte Kemp

James Kemp (7 September 1797 – 21 February 1872) was a missionary for the Church of England, co-founding the second Church Missionary Society (CMS) station in New Zealand at Kerikeri. Born in England, he came to New Zealand with his wife, Charlotte Kemp, in 1819 and settled in Kerikeri where the CMS station was founded. He taught at the station's schools and conducted services in nearby villages. He also supervised the building of the Stone Store in Kerikeri. By 1840, he and his wife were the only missionaries in Kerikeri and during the Flagstaff War, were two of the few Europeans to remain in the area during the conflict. He died in Auckland at the age of 75.

== Early life ==
Born on 7 September 1797, James Kemp was the son of Richard and Ann Kemp, of Wymondham in Norfolk, England. He was working as a blacksmith when he met his future wife Charlotte Butcher. The couple married on 16 November 1818 at Wymondham Abbey and then emigrated to New Zealand.

== Missionary work ==
After sailing aboard the Baring to Sydney, in Australia, Kemp and his wife transferred to the General Gates for the trip to the Bay of Islands, their final destination. Arriving on 12 August 1819, they initially lived at Hohi before moving a few months later to a settlement in Kerikeri, where Charlotte Kemp was one of the first European women in the area. A Church Missionary Society (CMS) station had been built there, the second to be established in New Zealand. A blacksmith's shop had been built at the station and Kemp was kept busy making fittings for the buildings being erected and goods for trading. Other missionaries who accompanied the Kemps included Thomas Kendall and John Gare Butler. However, the latter two were soon in argument, making it difficult for the Kemps.

When the Kemps arrived at Kerikeri, the Musket Wars was a constant presence. Nearby was the main pā (fort) of Hongi Hika, a Māori rangatira (chief) of the Ngāpuhi iwi (tribe). Hika often raided neighbouring tribes and brought back slaves, to the dismay of the missionaries. They witnessed acts of cannibalism, and Kemp was offered human flesh for consumption. They also had to deal with the threats to their wellbeing and property. Enemies of Hika would raid Kerikeri, for example seizing blacksmith tools and pigs from the missionaries in November 1819.

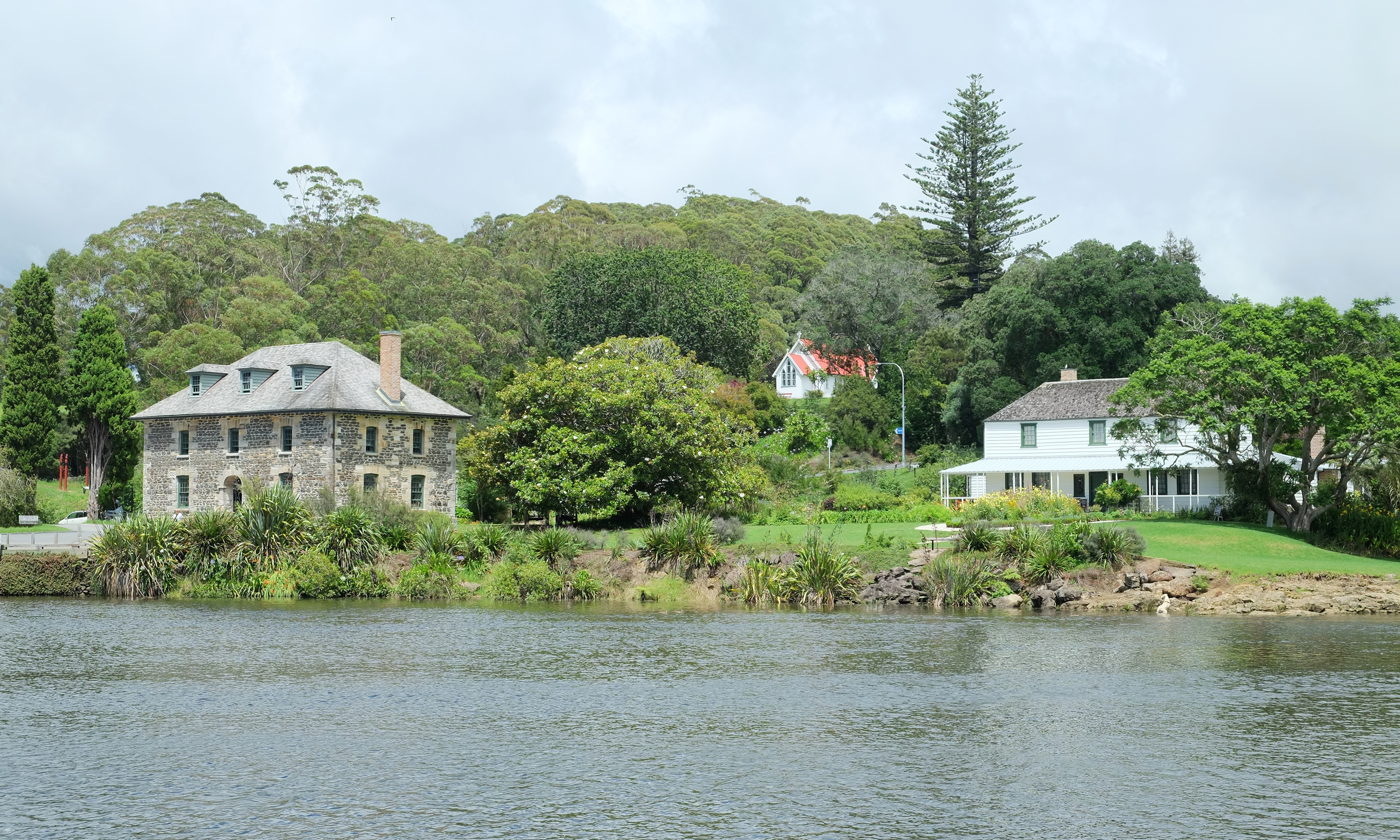
The CMS station at Kerikeri included the Stone Store, on the left, and Mission House, on the right

Kemp became well respected by local Māori and mediated in some intertribal conflicts that arose in the area. He made visits to the local villages and taught in the boys' schools established by the CMS; his wife taught at the CMS girls' school. He also took services for Māori but found this work was compromised by his other duties, which also affected his ability to become fluent in the local language.

One of his main duties was the running of the CMS store, which was a source of supplies for other missions. For four years from 1832, he oversaw the building of the Stone Store at Kerikeri. At the same time, he and his wife moved into Mission House. By 1835, the couple had eight children, although an infant died the same year. The Kemps were set to be transferred by the CMS, which was considering closing the station at Kerikeri on economic grounds, to the Bay of Plenty, to establish a mission at Tauranga. Following the loss of their child, this added to Charlotte Kemp's stress and she became unwell. The move to Tauranga was cancelled and they remained in Kerikeri, and Kemp convinced the CMS to keep the station running. By 1840, they were the only missionaries left in the town.

Despite the CMS beginning to reduce its financial support for the Kerikeri station, the Kemps remained there throughout the Flagstaff War of 1845–46, some of the few Europeans in the area to do so. For part of the conflict, their station was used as barracks for British troops. They also tended to wounded soldiers following engagements with Ngāpuhi war parties at Ōkaihau and Ōhaeawai. In August 1848, the CMS station at Kerikeri was closed. A factor in this was Kemp's refusal to consider a transfer to another CMS station due to the impact on his wife's health; Charlotte had continued to suffer relapses after her illness of 1835 and the closure of the station brought on another decline in her health. He declined an invitation from the local committee of the CMS to move to Tūranga, on the East Cape, the following year for similar reasons. He retired in 1850, and continued to live in Mission House which, as it was CMS property, he exchanged for land he had purchased elsewhere in Kerikeri. For several years Kemp ran the Stone Store, which had been leased from the CMS by his sons, James and Richard.

Kemp died in Auckland, where he had resided at Symonds Street, on 21 February 1872, after a few days of illness. He is buried at St. Stephen's Cemetery, in Parnell. His wife had predeceased him several years previously.

== Legacy ==
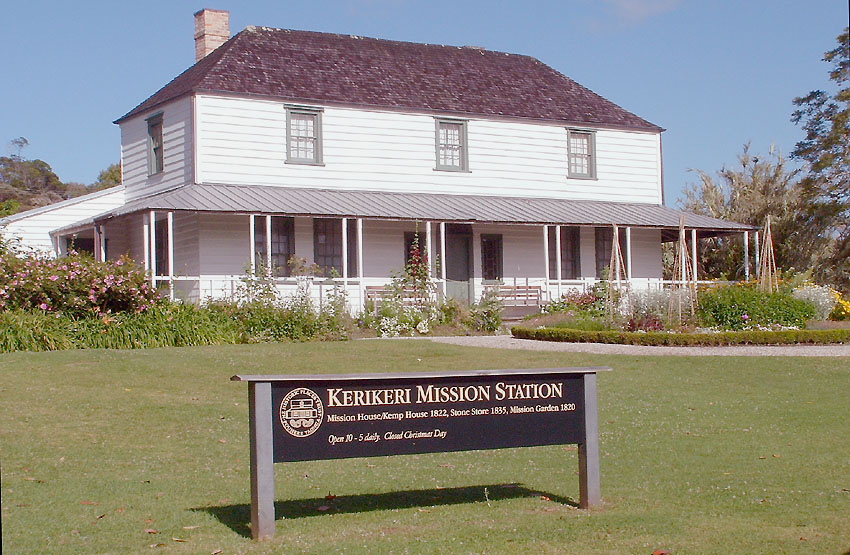
The former Kemp residence in Kerikeri, Mission House

In 1928, a tablet was unveiled to Kemp's memory in his former residence, Mission House. The building remained in the Kemp family's hands until 1974, when it was donated to the New Zealand Historic Places Trust by his great-grandson. The oldest European building in New Zealand, it was added to the New Zealand Historic Places Category 1 list on 23 June 1983.
