= Kerikeri =

Town in the Northland Region of New Zealand

- Town
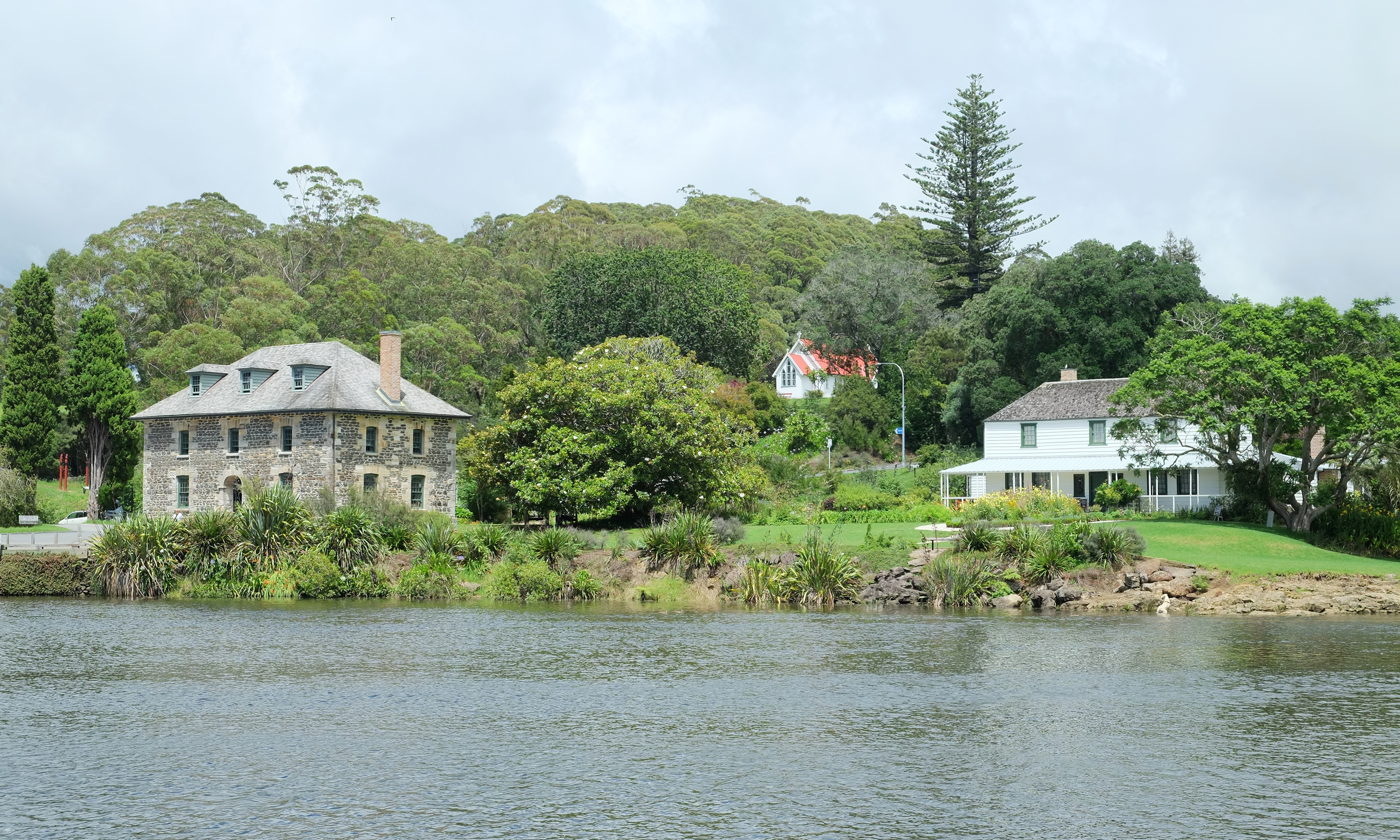
- The Kerikeri Mission Station, with the Stone Store at left, St James at rear, and Mission House on the right
- Interactive map of Kerikeri
- Coordinates: 35°13′28″S 173°57′5″E
- Country: New Zealand
- Region: Northland Region
- District: Far North District
- Ward: Bay of Islands-Whangaroa
- Community: Bay of Islands-Whangaroa
- Subdivision: Kerikeri
- Settled by Europeans: 1814
- Electorates: Northland; Te Tai Tokerau

Government
  - Territorial Authority: Far North District Council
  - Regional council: Northland Regional Council
  - Mayor of the Far North: Moko Tepania
  - Northland MP: Grant McCallum
  - Te Tai Tokerau MP: TBD

Area
  - Total: 22.05 km^{2} (8.51 sq mi)

Population (June 2025)
  - Total: 8,380
  - Density: 380/km^{2} (984/sq mi)
- Postcode(s): 0230

Kerikeri (Māori: [kɛɾikɛɾi]) is a town in the Bay of Islands, in the Far North District of the North Island of New Zealand. It lies at the head of Kerikeri Inlet, a northwestern arm of the Bay of Islands, where fresh water of the Kerikeri River enters the Pacific Ocean. It is sometimes called the Cradle of the Nation, as it was the site of the first permanent Christian mission station in the country, and has some of the oldest buildings in the country. It is a rapidly expanding centre of subtropical and allied horticulture.

== Naming ==
The missionaries who established the settlement of Kerikeri initially called it Gloucester Town, but this name did not see continued use. The etymology of Kerikeri is unknown with several origins suggested; one possible origin is from the Māori language verb kerikeri meaning 'to dig'.

== History ==
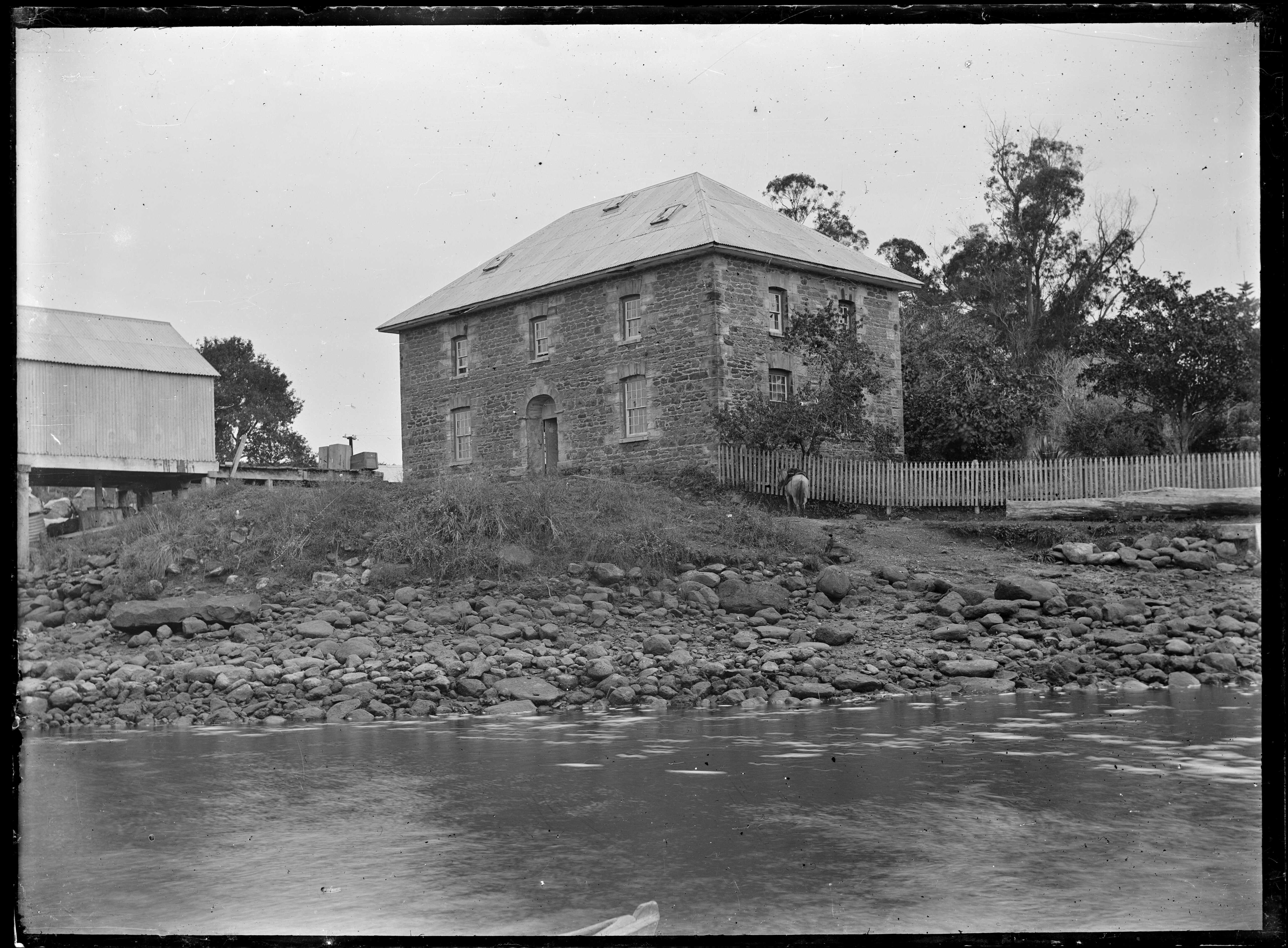
Stone Store at Kerikeri in 1912

In c. 1770, Ngāpuhi conquered the area from another iwi (tribe).

In 1814, Samuel Marsden acquired land at Kerikeri from Hongi Hika for the use of the Church Missionary Society for a payment of forty-eight axes. In 1819, Marsden established the second Church Missionary Society mission in New Zealand at the Kerikeri Basin. The protector of the mission station was the chief Ruatara, a nephew of Hongi Hika. Hongi Hika traded with the missionaries, typically exchanging kūmara for arms and ammunition, which he used in raiding rival tribes. By 1827, Hongi and his followers had left Kerikeri, leaving the missionaries with a much smaller native population to proselytise and educate. The mission closed in 1848 due to a declining Māori population and increasing obsolescence of the settlement in favour of Russell.

Following the departure of the Māori populace many Europeans started obtaining land in the area in the 1840s. By the 1890s, most of the land was part of a sheep and cattle station owned by Thomas Coldham Williams, a son of Henry Williams, one of the original missionaries. In 1927, George Alderton purchased the station. He owned the North Auckland Land Development Corporation and subdivided the station into orchards and forestry land. Today, Kerikeri is one of the largest horticultural areas in Northland.

Kerikeri was the first place in New Zealand where grape vines were planted. Marsden planted 100 vines on 25 September 1819 and noted in his journal that New Zealand promised to be very favourable to the vine. In the same year Charlotte Kemp planted the first citrus. New Zealand's first commercial plantings of passionfruit were established in 1927. The plough was first used in New Zealand at Kerikeri, by Rev. J. G. Butler, on 3 May 1820.

Since the 1990s Kerikeri has seen growth spurred by both domestic and international migration.

== Geography ==
Kerikeri is situated at the head of Kerikeri Inlet, a northwestern arm of the Bay of Islands, where fresh water of the Kerikeri River enters the Pacific Ocean.

== Demographics ==
Kerikeri has noticeably different demographics from other towns in the Far North. In 2001, over 90% of residents identified as European compared to just over 40% for both Kawakawa and Kaikohe.

Kerikeri covers 22.05 km^{2} (8.51 sq mi) and had an estimated population of 8,380 as of June 2025, with a population density of 380 people per km^{2}.

Historical population
| Year | Pop. | ±% p.a. |
|---|---|---|
| 2006 | 5,490 | — |
| 2013 | 6,006 | +1.29% |
| 2018 | 7,185 | +3.65% |
| 2023 | 8,070 | +2.35% |
The 2006 population is for a larger area of 25.40 km^{2} Source:

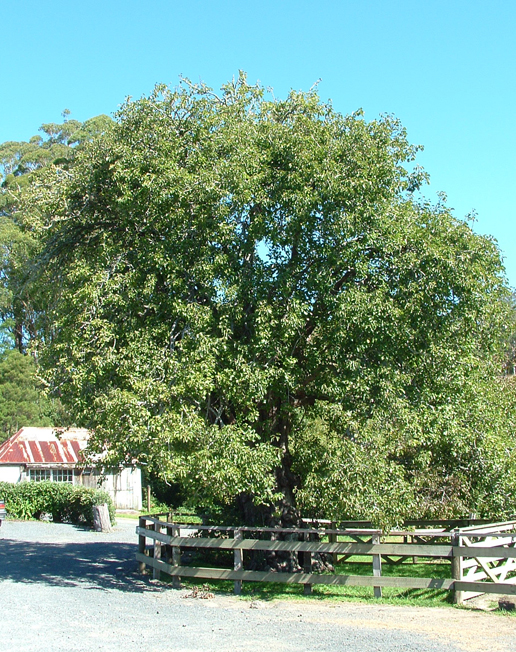
This pear tree is the oldest fruit tree in New Zealand, near the Stone Store, and still bears fruit. The building at rear is the historic blacksmith's shop established by the missionaries

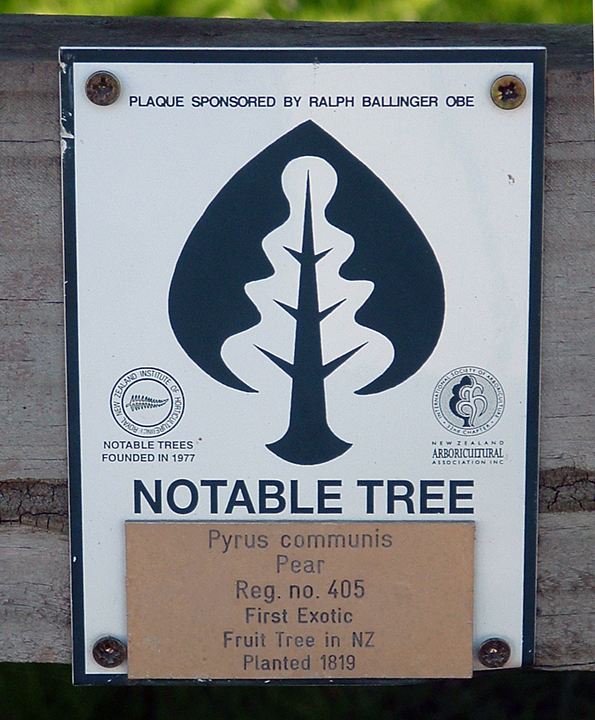
This plaque records details of the planting of the pear tree in 1819.

Kerikeri had a population of 8,070 in the 2023 New Zealand census, an increase of 885 people (12.3%) since the 2018 census, and an increase of 2,064 people (34.4%) since the 2013 census. There were 3,870 males, 4,173 females and 30 people of other genders in 3,336 dwellings. 2.3% of people identified as LGBTIQ+. The median age was 51.4 years (compared with 38.1 years nationally). There were 1,302 people (16.1%) aged under 15 years, 1,014 (12.6%) aged 15 to 29, 3,147 (39.0%) aged 30 to 64, and 2,613 (32.4%) aged 65 or older.

People could identify as more than one ethnicity. The results were 84.8% European (Pākehā); 18.3% Māori; 3.3% Pasifika; 6.4% Asian; 1.1% Middle Eastern, Latin American and African New Zealanders (MELAA); and 2.5% other, which includes people giving their ethnicity as "New Zealander". English was spoken by 97.8%, Māori language by 4.5%, Samoan by 0.4% and other languages by 10.9%. No language could be spoken by 1.5% (e.g. too young to talk). New Zealand Sign Language was known by 0.3%. The percentage of people born overseas was 30.3, compared with 28.8% nationally.

Religious affiliations were 31.7% Christian, 1.4% Hindu, 0.3% Islam, 1.0% Māori religious beliefs, 0.7% Buddhist, 0.5% New Age, 0.2% Jewish, and 1.6% other religions. People who answered that they had no religion were 55.0%, and 7.7% of people did not answer the census question.

Of those at least 15 years old, 1,149 (17.0%) people had a bachelor's or higher degree, 3,549 (52.4%) had a post-high school certificate or diploma, and 1,644 (24.3%) people exclusively held high school qualifications. The median income was $33,700, compared with $41,500 nationally. 627 people (9.3%) earned over $100,000 compared to 12.1% nationally. The employment status of those at least 15 was that 2,643 (39.1%) people were employed full-time, 933 (13.8%) were part-time, and 156 (2.3%) were unemployed.

Individual statistical areas
| Name | Area (km^{2}) | Population | Density (per km^{2}) | Dwellings | Median age | Median income |
|---|---|---|---|---|---|---|
| Riverview | 7.59 | 2,595 | 342 | 993 | 49.6 years | $36,200 |
| Kerikeri Central | 3.71 | 2,661 | 717 | 1,161 | 48.4 years | $29,700 |
| Kerikeri South | 10.75 | 2,814 | 262 | 1,182 | 55.0 years | $36,700 |
| New Zealand | | | | | 38.1 years | $41,500 |

== Historic sites ==
Kerikeri is home to many historic sites, most are located in the Kerikeri Basin, which is registered as a historic area.

=== Kororipo pā ===
Kororipo pā is the remains of a Māori fortified settlement in the Kerikeri Basin. Historically it is known Ngāi Tawake defended the pā in the 1770s; the pa was an important strategical asset as it provided access to the sea. The pā was also the launch place Hongi Hika used in the 1820s for raids on other tribes.

=== Mission House ===
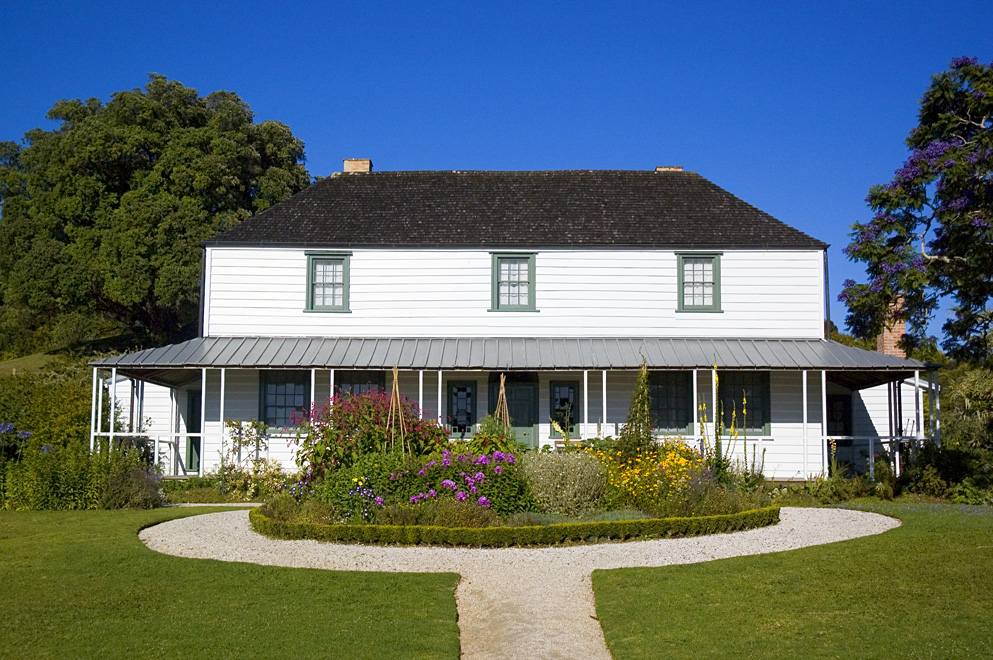
Mission House, Kerikeri

Originally known as the Mission House, and then for more than 100 years Kemp House, but now known as Kerikeri Mission House, it is the oldest extant building in New Zealand.

The two-storey Georgian structure was constructed from 1821 to 1822 by the Church Missionary Society. It was built to house the Reverend John Gare Butler. James Kemp and his family occupied the building in 1832 and the Kemp family continued to live in the house long after the closure of the Kerikeri mission in 1848. The Kemp family continued to live in the building until Ernest Kemp donated the property to the New Zealand Historic Places Trust in 1974.

=== St. James Church ===
St James Church is a Gothic Revival Anglican church situated on a hillock overlooking the Kerikeri Basin. The church was built in 1878 to replace an earlier chapel constructed in 1829. St James was opened by the Reverend Taua and Archdeacon of Waimate Edward Clarke. In the 1960s St James Church was expanded due to growth in the population of Kerikeri.

=== Stone Store ===
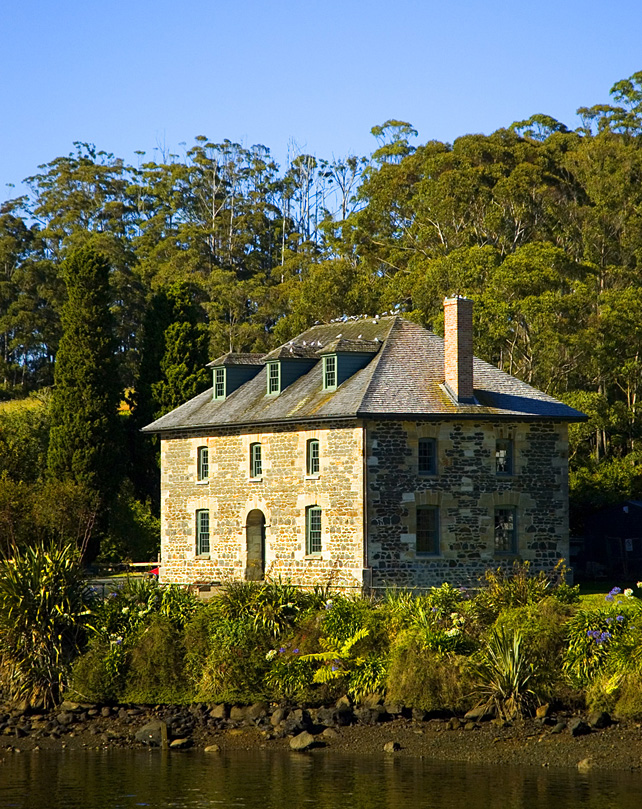
The Stone Store, Kerikeri

The Stone Store is New Zealand's oldest extant stone building. The building was constructed in the early 1830s as a warehouse for the Church Missionary Society. The Stone Store was constructed in a Georgian style from basalt and sandstone. It is registered as a category 1 historic building with Heritage New Zealand.

=== Te Ahurea ===
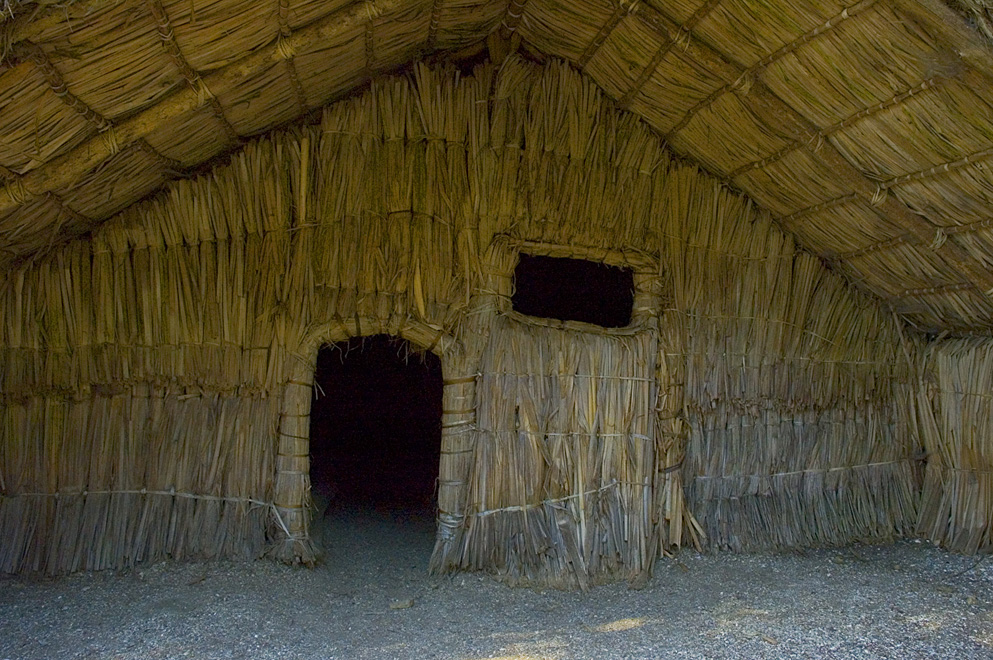
A hut at Rewa's Village

Rewa's Village was built in the 1970s to fundraise for legal services to stop a housing subdivision in the Kerikeri Basin area. The land was later bought and turned into a public reserve. Ngāti Rēhia took over the site in 2020 and renamed it Te Ahurea (lit. 'culture') following $1.25 million being granted from the Provincial Growth Fund. Rewa's Village was a recreation of a fishing village but today Te Ahurea contains recreated whare, gardens for growing traditional medicine, waka tours, and cultural workshops. The attraction is based on the 1790–1835 period of Maori culture.

== Arts and culture ==
The KOAST (Kerikeri Open Art Studios Trail), which highlights Kerikeri local artists and art galleries, is an annual arts trail held over Labour Weekend since 2014. In 2019 the trail featured 40 artists at 21 studios. The Turner Centre, a performing arts and events venue, opened in 2005. It presents nationally touring events as well as locally produced performances.

== Education ==
Kerikeri High School is the largest school in Northland. A secondary (years 7–13) school, with a roll of 1,640

Kerikeri Primary School and Riverview School are contributing primary (years 1–6) schools with rolls of 511 and 406 students.

Springbank School is a private composite (years 1–13) school with a roll of 197.

All these schools are coeducational. School rolls are as of July 2026.

NorthTec polytechnic also has a campus in Kerikeri.

== Airport ==
Kerikeri Airport, 4.2 km from town at 35°16′S 173°55′E, is called the Bay of Islands Airport. It is served by Air New Zealand and Barrier Air flights from Auckland and has a steadily increasing patronage, handling a record 110,000 passengers in financial 2017/2018. The existing terminal was not fit for purpose and did not meet Air New Zealand's requirements, while growth in passenger numbers also put pressure on the existing facilities. A new $4.75 million terminal opened on 16 June 2019 with improved arrivals/departures, baggage screening and luggage collection facilities.

== Climate ==
Climate data for Kerikeri (1991–2020 normals, extremes 1945–present)
| Month | Jan | Feb | Mar | Apr | May | Jun | Jul | Aug | Sep | Oct | Nov | Dec | Year |
|---|---|---|---|---|---|---|---|---|---|---|---|---|---|
| Record high °C (°F) | 34.3 (93.7) | 33.2 (91.8) | 29.4 (84.9) | 29.6 (85.3) | 25.2 (77.4) | 21.6 (70.9) | 21.9 (71.4) | 21.8 (71.2) | 26.0 (78.8) | 26.4 (79.5) | 29.4 (84.9) | 30.3 (86.5) | 34.3 (93.7) |
| Mean daily maximum °C (°F) | 24.5 (76.1) | 24.4 (75.9) | 22.9 (73.2) | 20.6 (69.1) | 18.1 (64.6) | 15.9 (60.6) | 15.1 (59.2) | 15.6 (60.1) | 17.2 (63.0) | 18.9 (66.0) | 20.5 (68.9) | 22.7 (72.9) | 19.7 (67.5) |
| Daily mean °C (°F) | 19.3 (66.7) | 19.8 (67.6) | 18.3 (64.9) | 16.2 (61.2) | 14.1 (57.4) | 12.0 (53.6) | 11.2 (52.2) | 11.5 (52.7) | 12.8 (55.0) | 14.1 (57.4) | 15.6 (60.1) | 17.8 (64.0) | 15.2 (59.4) |
| Mean daily minimum °C (°F) | 14.1 (57.4) | 15.1 (59.2) | 13.6 (56.5) | 11.8 (53.2) | 10.1 (50.2) | 8.1 (46.6) | 7.3 (45.1) | 7.4 (45.3) | 8.4 (47.1) | 9.4 (48.9) | 10.7 (51.3) | 13.0 (55.4) | 10.8 (51.4) |
| Record low °C (°F) | 4.8 (40.6) | 5.3 (41.5) | 3.2 (37.8) | 1.9 (35.4) | −0.3 (31.5) | −1.5 (29.3) | −2.0 (28.4) | −0.8 (30.6) | −0.8 (30.6) | 1.7 (35.1) | 3.0 (37.4) | 3.3 (37.9) | −2.0 (28.4) |
| Average rainfall mm (inches) | 111.9 (4.41) | 123.0 (4.84) | 135.8 (5.35) | 151.6 (5.97) | 173.8 (6.84) | 198.3 (7.81) | 226.5 (8.92) | 185.6 (7.31) | 159.4 (6.28) | 116.5 (4.59) | 100.2 (3.94) | 141.6 (5.57) | 1,824.2 (71.83) |
| Average precipitation days (≥ 1mm) | 6.8 | 7.8 | 8.7 | 10.3 | 11.9 | 12.5 | 14.8 | 13.7 | 12.4 | 9.8 | 8.7 | 8.2 | 125.5 |
Source: NIWA
