= Stone Store =

Historic building in New Zealand

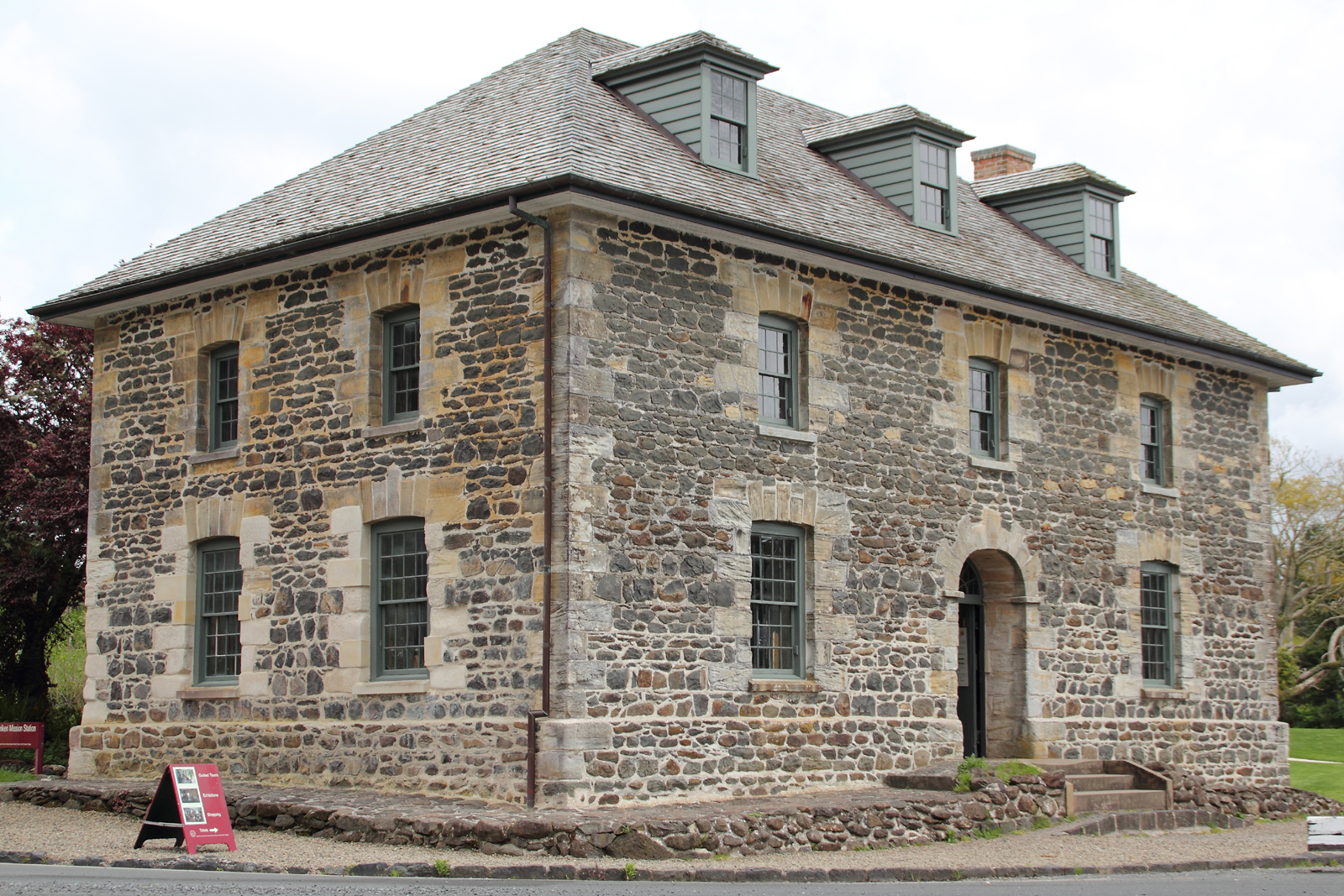

General information
- Architectural style: Georgian
- Location: Kerikeri basin, 246 Kerikeri Road, Kerikeri, New Zealand
- Coordinates: 35.2177782°S 173.96267039999998°E
- Construction started: 1832
- Completed: 1836

Design and construction
- Architect: John Hobbs

Heritage New Zealand – Category 1
- Designated: 23 June 1983
- Reference no.: 5

The Stone Store is the oldest undamaged stone building in New Zealand. The Stone Store was constructed from 1832 to 1836 by the Church Missionary Society in Kerikeri as a warehouse to a Georgian design by John Hobbs. The quality of the building lead to it being retained after the Church Missionary Society's decline. The Stone Store was eventually purchased by the New Zealand Historic Places Trust and is today managed as a tourist attraction. The Stone Store is registered as a category 1 building with Heritage New Zealand.

== Description ==
The Stone Store is a two-storey Georgian warehouse constructed from local basalt and sandstone from Parramatta and Sydney.

== History ==
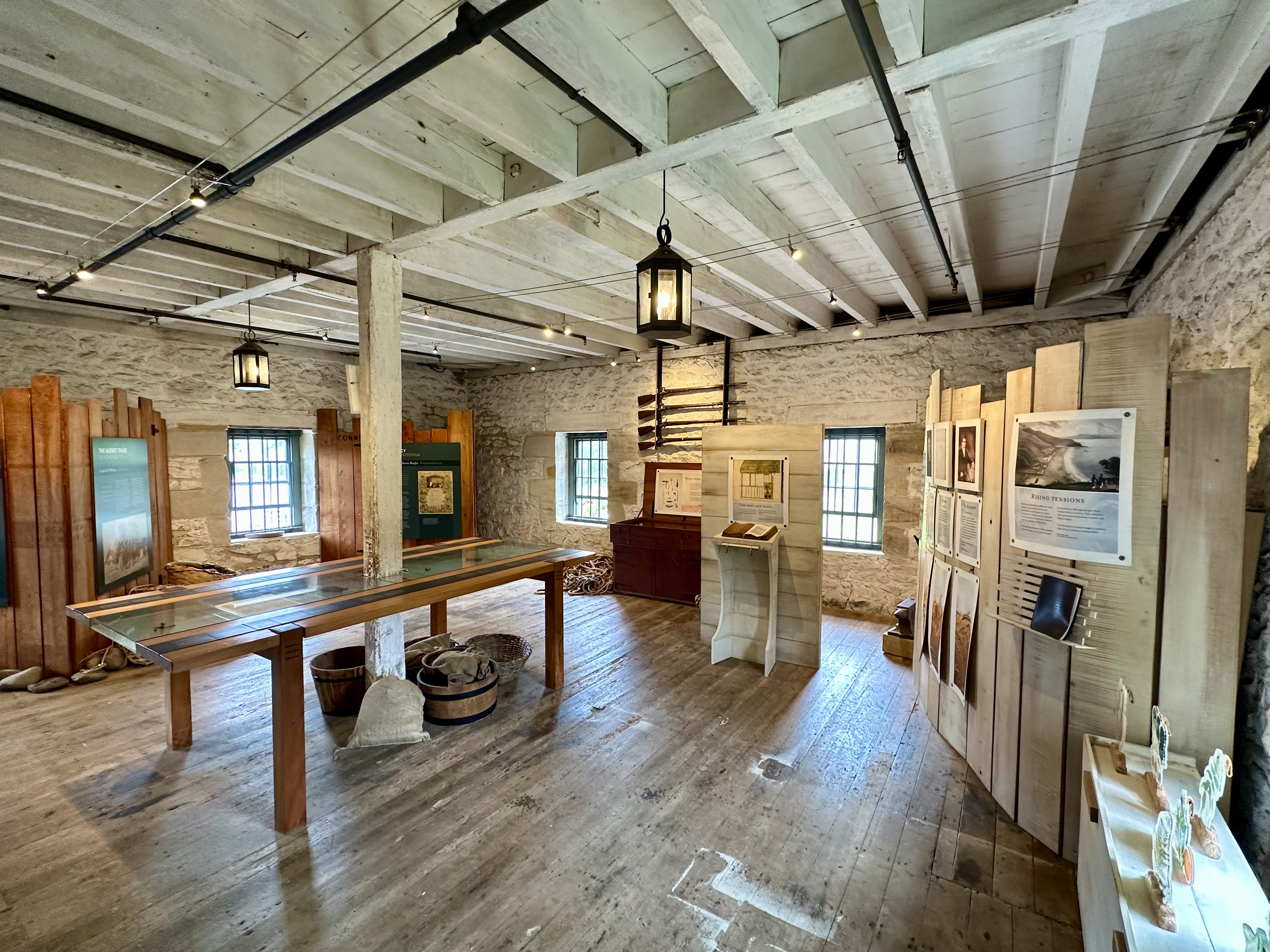
The Kerikeri Stone Store historic quarters.

The Church Missionary Society established a settlement at Kerikeri in 1819. Kerikeri was used as a base for other missions in the area and the Stone Store was constructed to house local and imported goods. John Hobbs designed the warehouse but during construction a clocktower and bell were added onto the design; however, these were removed sometime before 1858. The Stone Store was constructed from 1832 to 1836 with local Māori used for basic labour and the mission providing craftsmen. James Kemp oversaw the construction.

Following the decline of Kerikeri's population the station became less important but the building was still used to house the Bishop of New Zealand, George Augustus Selwyn's library whilst he was involved with the mission at Te Waimate. During the Flagstaff War the building was used to store munitions.

The Kerikeri mission had closed in 1848 and tenanted the building, during this period the building saw many uses including as a post office, a native school, and a store. In 1893 the Kemp family purchased the building and continued to lease it out with uses including a polling station and as a boxing venue. Increasing tourism to Kerikeri resulted in the Stone Store becoming a self-service store in 1958.

In 1975 the New Zealand Historic Places Trust purchased the building.

== Legacy ==
Martin Jones described the Stone Store as having significance not just domestically but also internationally for the building's association with the Church Missionary Society, international trade, importation of sandstone from New South Wales, association with notable colonial figures, association with one of the earliest relations between European settlers and Māori, and for being the oldest undamaged stone building in New Zealand.

Due to the Stone Store's historic importance it is registered as a category 1 building with Heritage New Zealand.
