= Geography of the North Island =

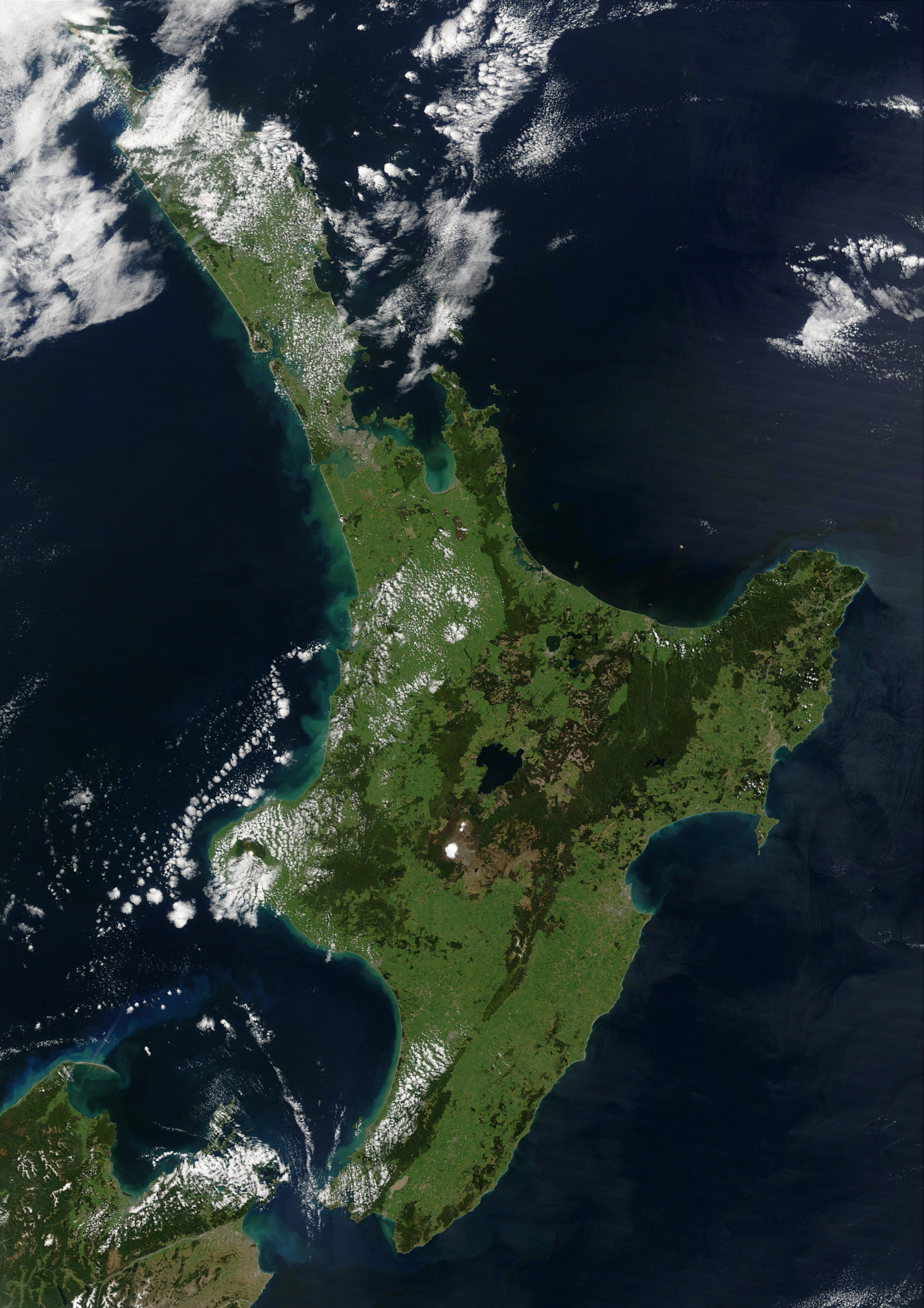
North Island is smaller but more populous than South Island.

The North Island, also officially named Te Ika-a-Māui, is one of the two main islands of New Zealand, separated from the larger but much less populous South Island by the Cook Strait. The island's area is 113,729 square kilometres (43,911 sq mi), making it the world's 14th-largest island. It has a population of 4,067,400 (June 2025), accounting for approximately 76% of the total residents of New Zealand.

Twelve main urban areas (half of them officially cities) are in the North Island. From north to south, they are Whangārei, Auckland, Hamilton, Tauranga, Rotorua, Gisborne, New Plymouth, Napier, Hastings, Whanganui, Palmerston North, and New Zealand's capital city Wellington, which is located at the south-west tip of the island. Wellington is the world's southernmost capital of a sovereign state.

== Overview ==
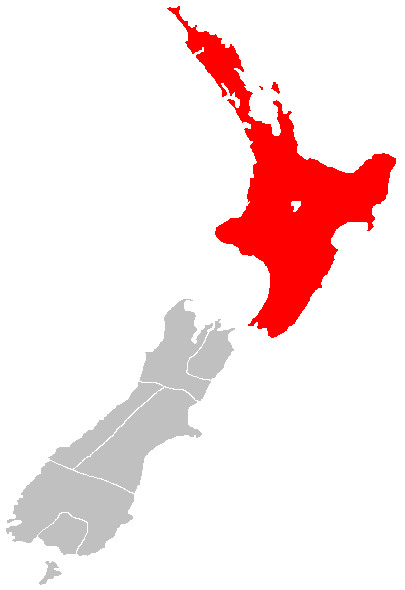
The North Island, in relation to the South Island and Stewart Island

During the Last Glacial Period when sea levels were over 100 metres lower than present day levels, the North and South islands were connected by a vast coastal plain which formed at the South Taranaki Bight. During this period, most of the North Island was covered in thorn scrubland and forest, while the modern-day Northland Peninsula was a subtropical rainforest. Sea levels began to rise 7,000 years ago, eventually separating the islands and linking the Cook Strait to the Tasman Sea.

=== Bays and coastal features ===
- Bay of Islands
- Bay of Plenty
- Hauraki Gulf
- Hawke Bay
- Ninety Mile Beach
- North Taranaki Bight
- South Taranaki Bight

=== Lakes and rivers ===
- Lake Taupō
- Waikato River
- Whanganui River

=== Capes and peninsulas ===
- Coromandel Peninsula
- Northland Peninsula
- Cape Palliser
- Cape Reinga
- East Cape
- North Cape

=== Forests and national parks ===
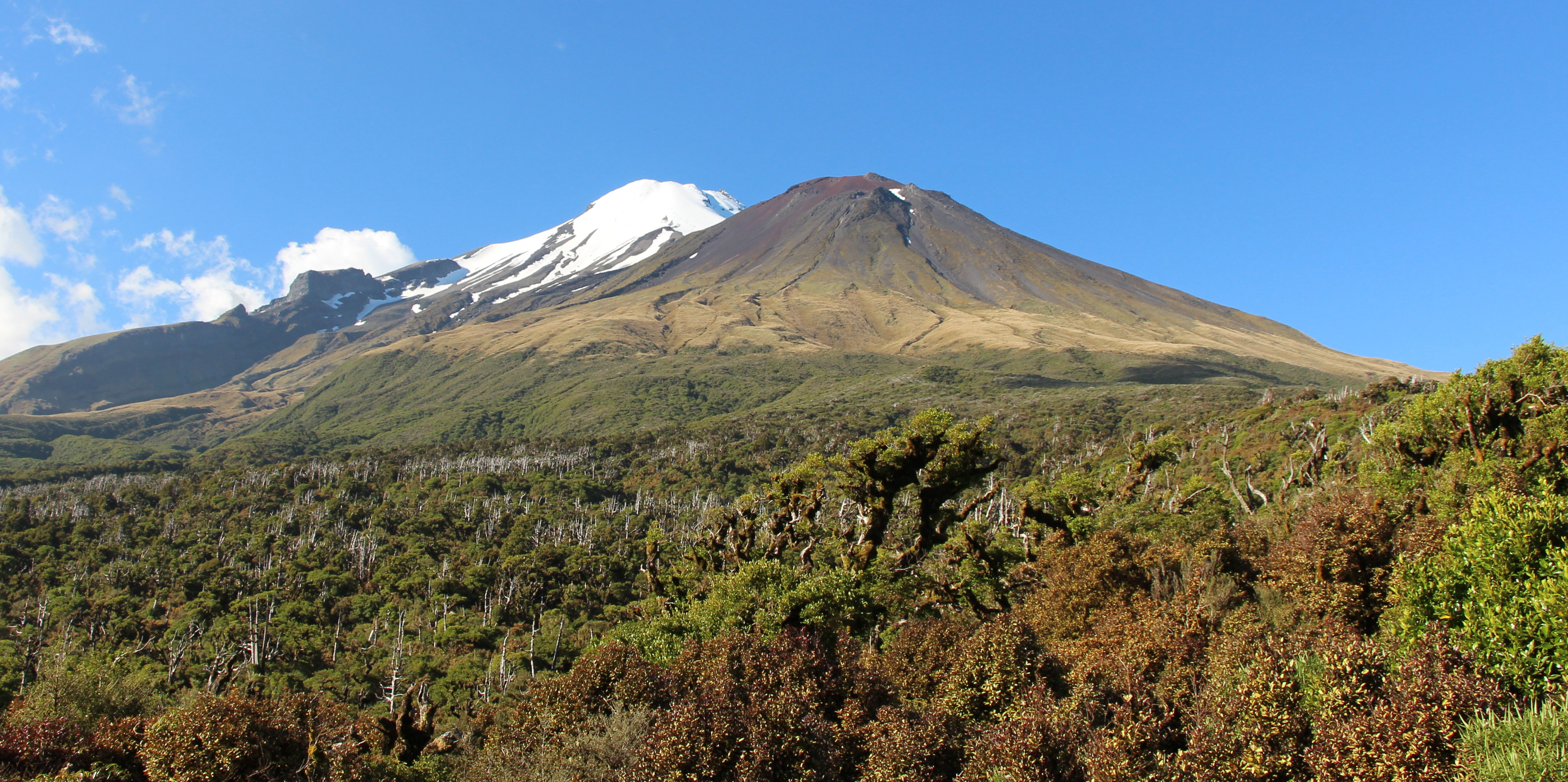
Egmont National Park

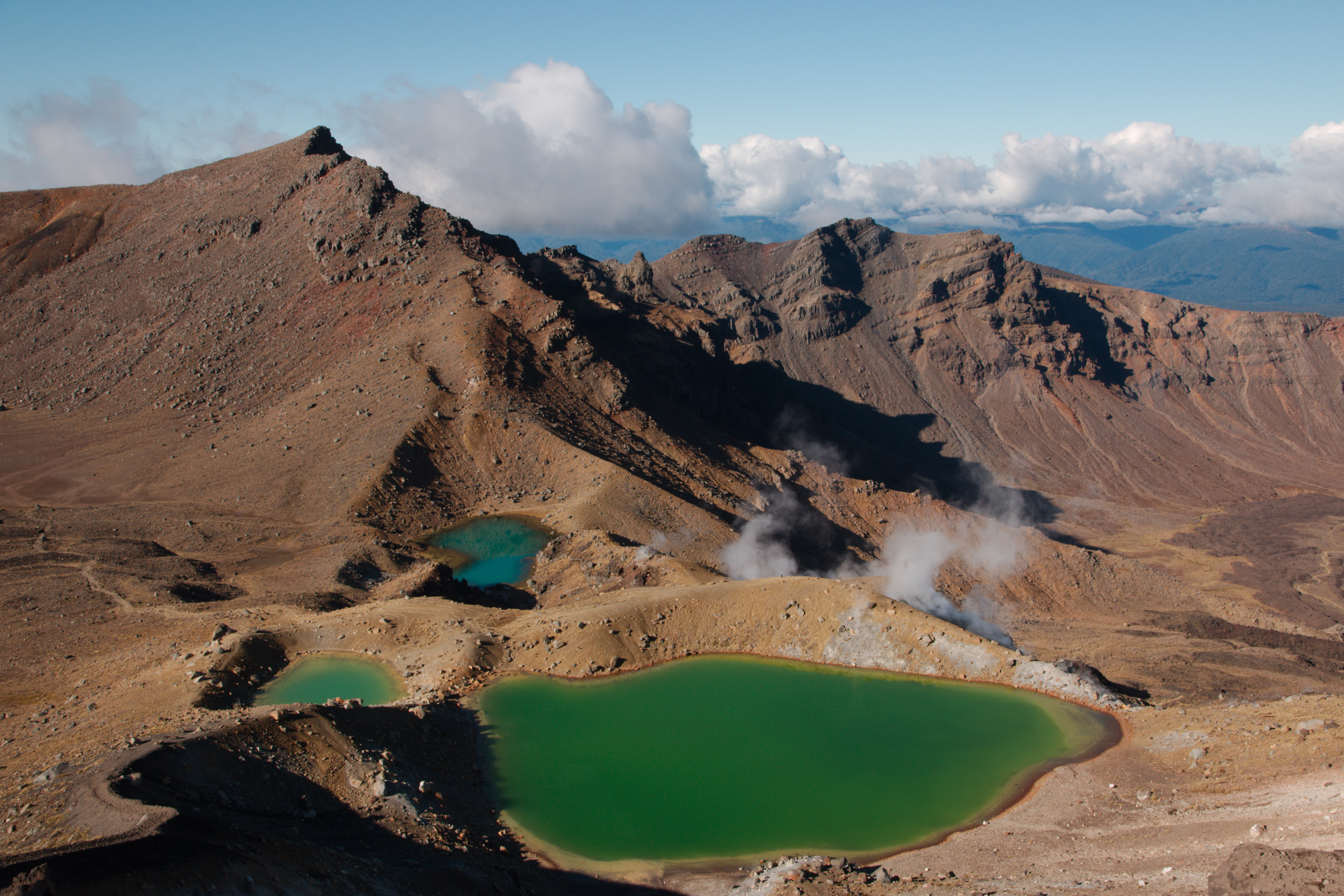
Tongariro National Park

- Egmont National Park
- Tongariro National Park
- Waipoua Kauri Forest
- Whanganui National Park
- and many forest parks of New Zealand

=== Volcanology ===
- Mount Ruapehu
- Mount Taranaki (Taranaki Maunga)
- North Island Volcanic Plateau

=== Other ===
- Waitomo Caves
- Taumatawhakatangihangakoauauotamateaturipukakapikimaungahoronukupokaiwhenuakitanatahu

== Climate ==
The climate of North Island is mainly temperate oceanic climate (Köppen: Cfb). Mean annual temperatures reach up to 16 °C (61 °F) in the north. There is a subtropical influence in the Northland Peninsula. Wellington the wettest of major cities in North Island, receiving around 1,200 millimetres (47 in) of precipitation annually. Auckland and Wellington both receive a yearly average of more than 2,000 hours of sunshine. Snow is rare at sea level in North Island. Snow has accumulated in Wellington on rare occasions, including in 2011. Wellington is also the windiest city in the world. Smog can occur on calm winter days in Auckland.

=== Climate data ===
Climate data for Auckland
Month	Jan	Feb	Mar	Apr	May	Jun	Jul	Aug	Sep	Oct	Nov	Dec	Year
Record high °C (°F)	30.0 (86.0)	30.5 (86.9)	29.8 (85.6)	26.5 (79.7)	24.6 (76.3)	23.8 (74.8)	19.0 (66.2)	20.6 (69.1)	22.0 (71.6)	23.6 (74.5)	25.9 (78.6)	28.3 (82.9)	30.5 (86.9)
Mean maximum °C (°F)	27.6 (81.7)	27.6 (81.7)	26.4 (79.5)	23.7 (74.7)	21.2 (70.2)	19.2 (66.6)	18.3 (64.9)	17.6 (63.7)	20.0 (68.0)	21.3 (70.3)	22.4 (72.3)	25.2 (77.4)	27.6 (81.7)
Mean daily maximum °C (°F)	23.1 (73.6)	23.7 (74.7)	22.4 (72.3)	20.1 (68.2)	17.7 (63.9)	15.5 (59.9)	14.7 (58.5)	15.1 (59.2)	16.5 (61.7)	17.8 (64.0)	19.5 (67.1)	21.6 (70.9)	19.0 (66.2)
Daily mean °C (°F)	19.1 (66.4)	19.7 (67.5)	18.4 (65.1)	16.1 (61.0)	14.0 (57.2)	11.8 (53.2)	10.9 (51.6)	11.3 (52.3)	12.7 (54.9)	14.2 (57.6)	15.7 (60.3)	17.8 (64.0)	15.2 (59.4)
Mean daily minimum °C (°F)	15.2 (59.4)	15.8 (60.4)	14.4 (57.9)	12.1 (53.8)	10.3 (50.5)	8.1 (46.6)	7.1 (44.8)	7.5 (45.5)	8.9 (48.0)	10.4 (50.7)	12.0 (53.6)	14.0 (57.2)	11.3 (52.3)
Mean minimum °C (°F)	11.4 (52.5)	11.8 (53.2)	10.9 (51.6)	7.4 (45.3)	5.5 (41.9)	2.7 (36.9)	1.9 (35.4)	3.0 (37.4)	4.9 (40.8)	6.5 (43.7)	8.3 (46.9)	10.5 (50.9)	1.9 (35.4)
Record low °C (°F)	5.6 (42.1)	8.7 (47.7)	6.6 (43.9)	3.9 (39.0)	0.9 (33.6)	−1.1 (30.0)	−3.9 (25.0)	−1.7 (28.9)	1.7 (35.1)	−0.6 (30.9)	4.4 (39.9)	7.0 (44.6)	−3.9 (25.0)
Average rainfall mm (inches)	73.3 (2.89)	66.1 (2.60)	87.3 (3.44)	99.4 (3.91)	112.6 (4.43)	126.4 (4.98)	145.1 (5.71)	118.4 (4.66)	105.1 (4.14)	100.2 (3.94)	85.8 (3.38)	92.8 (3.65)	1,210.7 (47.67)
Average rainy days (≥ 1.0 mm)	8.0	7.1	8.4	10.6	12.0	14.8	16.0	14.9	12.8	12.0	10.3	9.3	135.7
Average relative humidity (%)	79.3	79.8	80.3	83.0	85.8	89.8	88.9	86.2	81.3	78.5	77.2	77.6	82.3
Mean monthly sunshine hours	228.8	194.9	189.2	157.3	139.8	110.3	128.1	142.9	148.6	178.1	188.1	197.2	2,003.1
Source 1: NIWA Climate Data, CliFlo
Source 2: MetService

Climate data for Kelburn, Wellington
Month	Jan	Feb	Mar	Apr	May	Jun	Jul	Aug	Sep	Oct	Nov	Dec	Year
Record high °C (°F)	30.3 (86.5)	30.1 (86.2)	28.3 (82.9)	27.3 (81.1)	22.0 (71.6)	18.3 (64.9)	17.6 (63.7)	19.3 (66.7)	21.9 (71.4)	25.1 (77.2)	26.9 (80.4)	29.1 (84.4)	30.3 (86.5)
Mean daily maximum °C (°F)	20.2 (68.4)	20.4 (68.7)	19.0 (66.2)	16.6 (61.9)	14.0 (57.2)	11.9 (53.4)	11.2 (52.2)	11.9 (53.4)	13.4 (56.1)	15.0 (59.0)	16.7 (62.1)	18.7 (65.7)	15.8 (60.4)
Daily mean °C (°F)	16.7 (62.1)	16.9 (62.4)	15.7 (60.3)	13.7 (56.7)	11.4 (52.5)	9.3 (48.7)	8.6 (47.5)	9.2 (48.6)	10.5 (50.9)	11.9 (53.4)	13.4 (56.1)	15.3 (59.5)	12.7 (54.9)
Mean daily minimum °C (°F)	13.2 (55.8)	13.4 (56.1)	12.4 (54.3)	10.7 (51.3)	8.6 (47.5)	6.7 (44.1)	5.9 (42.6)	6.4 (43.5)	7.5 (45.5)	8.8 (47.8)	10.2 (50.4)	12.0 (53.6)	9.7 (49.5)
Record low °C (°F)	4.1 (39.4)	5.2 (41.4)	4.6 (40.3)	2.6 (36.7)	1.0 (33.8)	−0.1 (31.8)	0.0 (32.0)	−0.1 (31.8)	0.2 (32.4)	1.2 (34.2)	1.7 (35.1)	3.4 (38.1)	−0.1 (31.8)
Average rainfall mm (inches)	77.5 (3.05)	77.0 (3.03)	85.8 (3.38)	100.9 (3.97)	120.7 (4.75)	132.4 (5.21)	136.0 (5.35)	125.5 (4.94)	100.8 (3.97)	110.3 (4.34)	91.5 (3.60)	92.0 (3.62)	1,250.4 (49.23)
Average rainy days (≥ 1.0 mm)	7.2	6.9	8.2	9.4	11.6	13.3	13.4	13.1	11.1	11.4	9.6	9.1	124.3
Average relative humidity (%)	79.4	81.5	82.1	82.7	84.3	86.0	85.8	84.3	80.6	80.3	79.0	79.7	82.2
Mean monthly sunshine hours	238.6	205.7	194.0	154.4	126.6	102.4	112.5	137.3	162.6	191.4	209.6	222.9	2,058.1
Percentage possible sunshine	52	54	51	47	42	37	38	42	46	47	48	48	46
Source: CliFlo

Climate data for Hamilton
Month	Jan	Feb	Mar	Apr	May	Jun	Jul	Aug	Sep	Oct	Nov	Dec	Year
Mean daily maximum °C (°F)	23.9 (75.0)	24.3 (75.7)	22.7 (72.9)	19.9 (67.8)	16.9 (62.4)	14.3 (57.7)	13.8 (56.8)	14.7 (58.5)	16.5 (61.7)	17.9 (64.2)	19.8 (67.6)	21.9 (71.4)	18.9 (66.0)
Daily mean °C (°F)	18.4 (65.1)	18.8 (65.8)	17.1 (62.8)	14.5 (58.1)	11.9 (53.4)	9.5 (49.1)	8.9 (48.0)	9.8 (49.6)	11.6 (52.9)	13.2 (55.8)	14.9 (58.8)	16.9 (62.4)	13.8 (56.8)
Mean daily minimum °C (°F)	12.9 (55.2)	13.2 (55.8)	11.4 (52.5)	9.1 (48.4)	6.9 (44.4)	4.7 (40.5)	4.0 (39.2)	4.9 (40.8)	6.7 (44.1)	8.4 (47.1)	9.9 (49.8)	11.9 (53.4)	8.7 (47.7)
Average precipitation mm (inches)	76.3 (3.00)	68.7 (2.70)	79.4 (3.13)	80.3 (3.16)	99.7 (3.93)	113.2 (4.46)	118.2 (4.65)	103.4 (4.07)	91.5 (3.60)	91.9 (3.62)	85.0 (3.35)	100.7 (3.96)	1,108.2 (43.63)
Average precipitation days (≥ 1.0 mm)	7.8	6.2	7.7	8.4	11.0	12.6	12.8	13.3	11.7	11.7	10.7	10.5	124.4
Average relative humidity (%)	80.5	84.3	84.7	86.4	89.9	91.4	90.8	88.2	83.2	81.9	79.1	79.9	85.0
Mean monthly sunshine hours	229.8	192.9	193.3	165.1	138.3	112.8	126.4	144.1	147.5	174.8	187.1	207.6	2,019.6
Source: NIWA

Climate data for Taupō
Month	Jan	Feb	Mar	Apr	May	Jun	Jul	Aug	Sep	Oct	Nov	Dec	Year
Mean daily maximum °C (°F)	22.7 (72.9)	22.6 (72.7)	20.4 (68.7)	17.2 (63.0)	14.1 (57.4)	11.7 (53.1)	11.0 (51.8)	11.9 (53.4)	13.9 (57.0)	15.8 (60.4)	18.3 (64.9)	20.7 (69.3)	16.9 (62.4)
Daily mean °C (°F)	17.0 (62.6)	17.1 (62.8)	14.9 (58.8)	12.0 (53.6)	9.4 (48.9)	7.4 (45.3)	6.5 (43.7)	7.2 (45.0)	9.2 (48.6)	11.1 (52.0)	13.1 (55.6)	15.6 (60.1)	11.7 (53.1)
Mean daily minimum °C (°F)	11.4 (52.5)	11.6 (52.9)	9.5 (49.1)	6.8 (44.2)	4.8 (40.6)	3.0 (37.4)	2.1 (35.8)	2.7 (36.9)	4.5 (40.1)	6.4 (43.5)	7.9 (46.2)	10.5 (50.9)	6.7 (44.1)
Average precipitation mm (inches)	77.3 (3.04)	67.9 (2.67)	66.5 (2.62)	68.4 (2.69)	74.9 (2.95)	92.8 (3.65)	96.0 (3.78)	87.4 (3.44)	81.6 (3.21)	86.2 (3.39)	67.9 (2.67)	93.6 (3.69)	960.3 (37.81)
Average precipitation days (≥ 1 mm)	7.7	6.7	7.3	7.4	8.7	10.9	10.9	11.4	10.7	10.6	8.2	9.2	109.6
Mean monthly sunshine hours	224.3	202.6	179.7	156.3	126.3	96.1	116.5	134.6	140.0	179.6	190.4	204.6	1,950.9
Source: NIWA Climate Data

Climate data for Napier
Month	Jan	Feb	Mar	Apr	May	Jun	Jul	Aug	Sep	Oct	Nov	Dec	Year
Mean daily maximum °C (°F)	24.5 (76.1)	24.2 (75.6)	22.7 (72.9)	19.9 (67.8)	17.4 (63.3)	15.0 (59.0)	14.1 (57.4)	15.1 (59.2)	17.3 (63.1)	19.2 (66.6)	20.9 (69.6)	23.2 (73.8)	19.5 (67.1)
Daily mean °C (°F)	19.5 (67.1)	19.4 (66.9)	17.7 (63.9)	15.0 (59.0)	12.4 (54.3)	10.0 (50.0)	9.4 (48.9)	10.3 (50.5)	12.3 (54.1)	14.3 (57.7)	16.1 (61.0)	18.4 (65.1)	14.6 (58.3)
Mean daily minimum °C (°F)	14.6 (58.3)	14.6 (58.3)	12.7 (54.9)	10.3 (50.5)	8.5 (47.3)	6.8 (44.2)	5.6 (42.1)	6.4 (43.5)	8.1 (46.6)	9.6 (49.3)	10.9 (51.6)	13.0 (55.4)	10.0 (50.0)
Average precipitation mm (inches)	46.8 (1.84)	54.3 (2.14)	66.8 (2.63)	67.9 (2.67)	74.8 (2.94)	82.1 (3.23)	108.3 (4.26)	60.1 (2.37)	57.9 (2.28)	59.9 (2.36)	52.4 (2.06)	53.5 (2.11)	784.8 (30.90)
Average precipitation days (≥ 1.0 mm)	6.0	5.9	7.2	7.1	7.9	8.8	9.4	8.2	7.4	7.5	6.0	6.5	88.1
Average relative humidity (%)	69.9	73.9	74.6	77.1	78.7	79.9	79.6	76.0	69.2	67.3	67.8	67.0	73.4
Mean monthly sunshine hours	249.3	202.6	201.7	172.4	155.6	130.7	134.7	166.8	181.2	213.9	216.2	233.7	2,258.7
Source: NIWA Climate Data

Climate data for Whangārei
Month	Jan	Feb	Mar	Apr	May	Jun	Jul	Aug	Sep	Oct	Nov	Dec	Year
Mean daily maximum °C (°F)	24.3 (75.7)	24.3 (75.7)	22.9 (73.2)	20.5 (68.9)	18.1 (64.6)	16.1 (61.0)	15.3 (59.5)	15.7 (60.3)	17.3 (63.1)	18.7 (65.7)	20.6 (69.1)	22.8 (73.0)	19.7 (67.5)
Daily mean °C (°F)	19.9 (67.8)	20.2 (68.4)	18.8 (65.8)	16.6 (61.9)	14.4 (57.9)	12.4 (54.3)	11.6 (52.9)	11.9 (53.4)	13.3 (55.9)	14.6 (58.3)	16.4 (61.5)	18.5 (65.3)	15.7 (60.3)
Mean daily minimum °C (°F)	15.5 (59.9)	16.1 (61.0)	14.7 (58.5)	12.8 (55.0)	10.8 (51.4)	8.7 (47.7)	7.8 (46.0)	8.2 (46.8)	9.3 (48.7)	10.7 (51.3)	12.3 (54.1)	14.2 (57.6)	11.8 (53.2)
Average precipitation mm (inches)	81.2 (3.20)	95.2 (3.75)	118.1 (4.65)	98.9 (3.89)	111.2 (4.38)	131.5 (5.18)	168.6 (6.64)	128.4 (5.06)	112.2 (4.42)	85.3 (3.36)	77.1 (3.04)	96.4 (3.80)	1,304 (51.34)
Average precipitation days (≥ 1.0 mm)	7.9	7.9	9.3	9.8	12.5	13.9	14.8	14.8	12.6	10.5	9.4	8.7	132.1
Average relative humidity (%)	80.4	83.5	84.2	86.0	88.0	89.5	88.9	86.1	81.2	79.8	77.2	78.0	83.6
Source: NIWA Climate Data

== See also ==
- Geography of New Zealand
- Geography of South Island
