= Geography of the South Island =

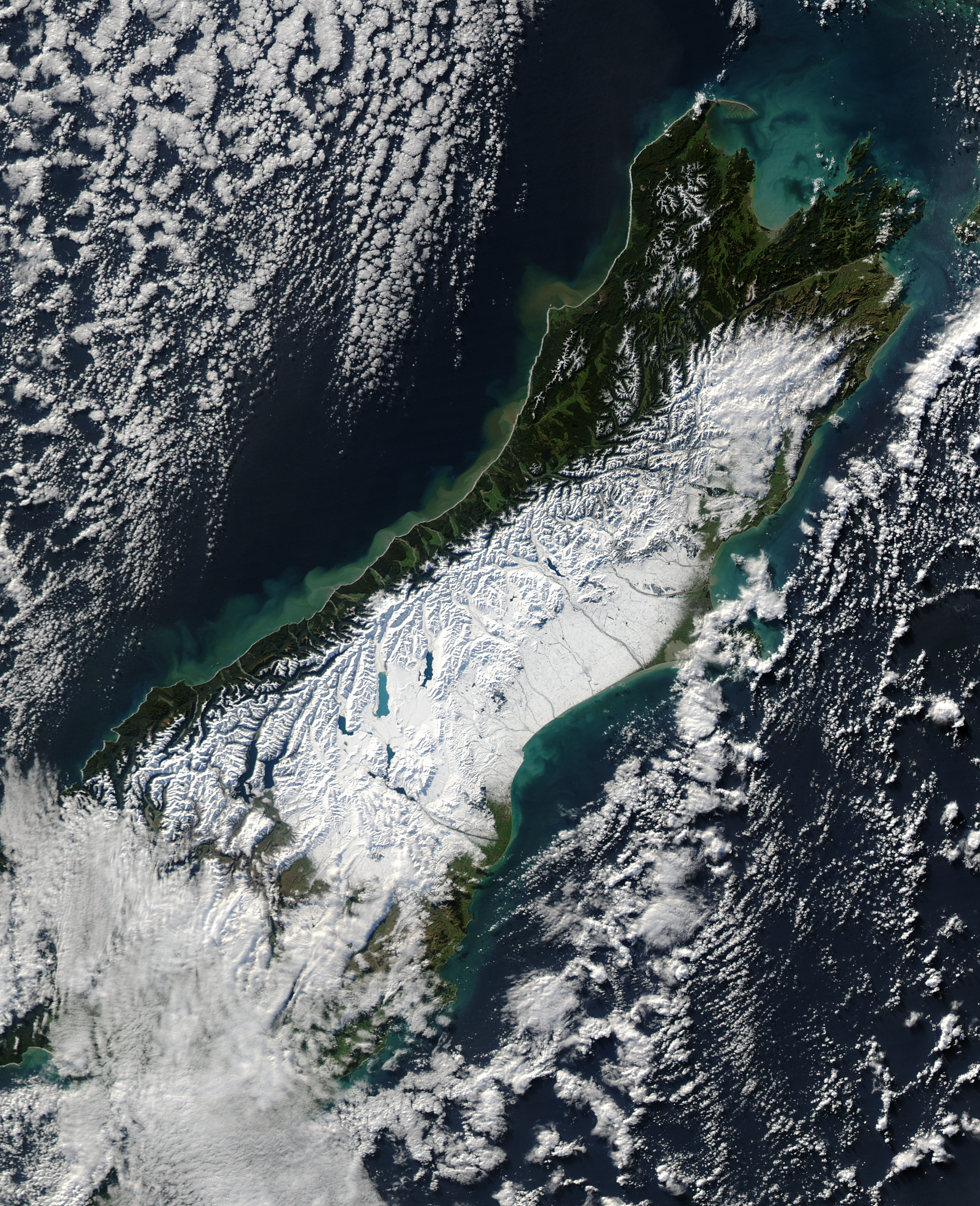
A true-colour image of the South Island, after a powerful winter storm swept across New Zealand on 12 June 2006

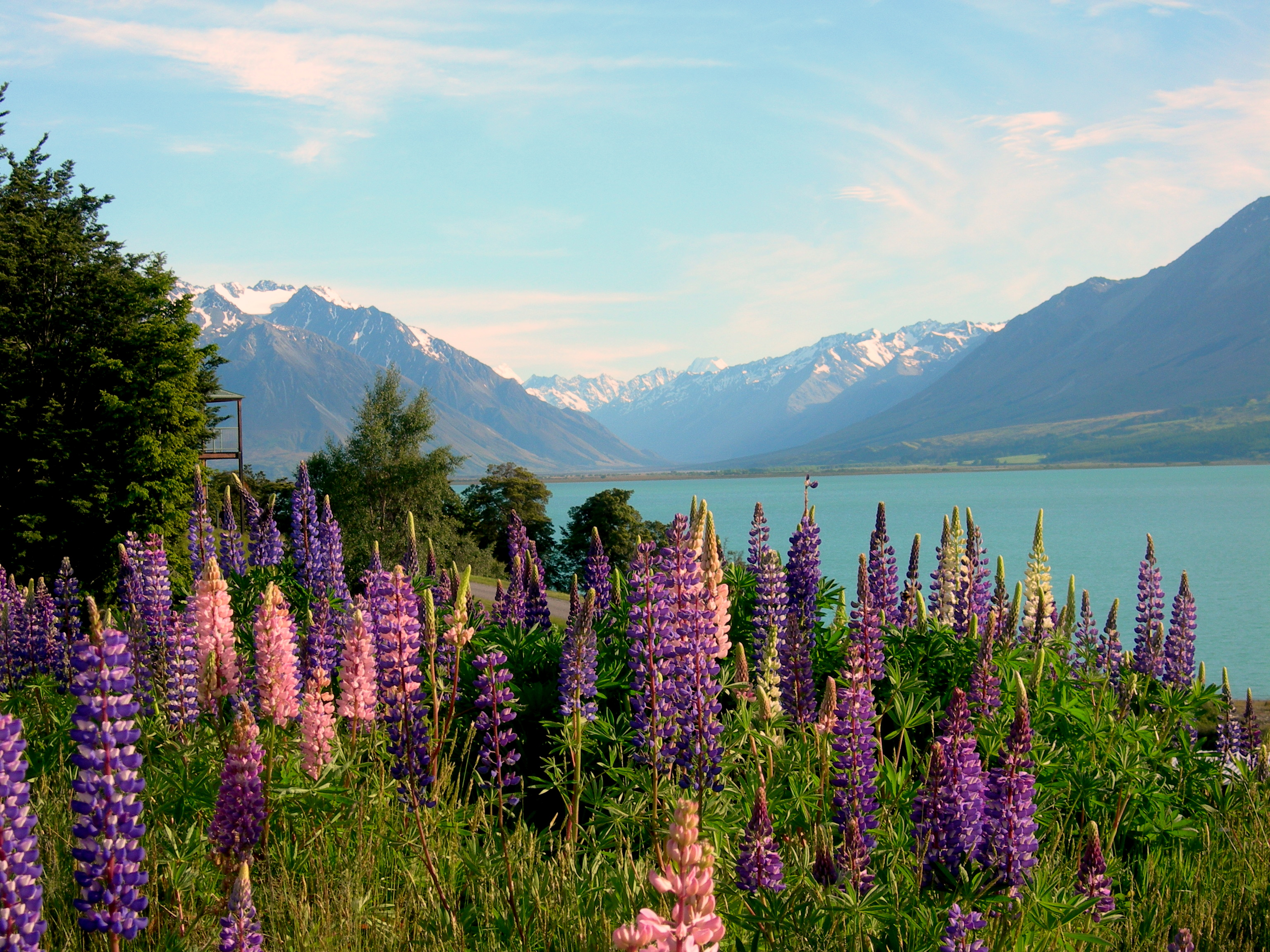
Lake Ōhau

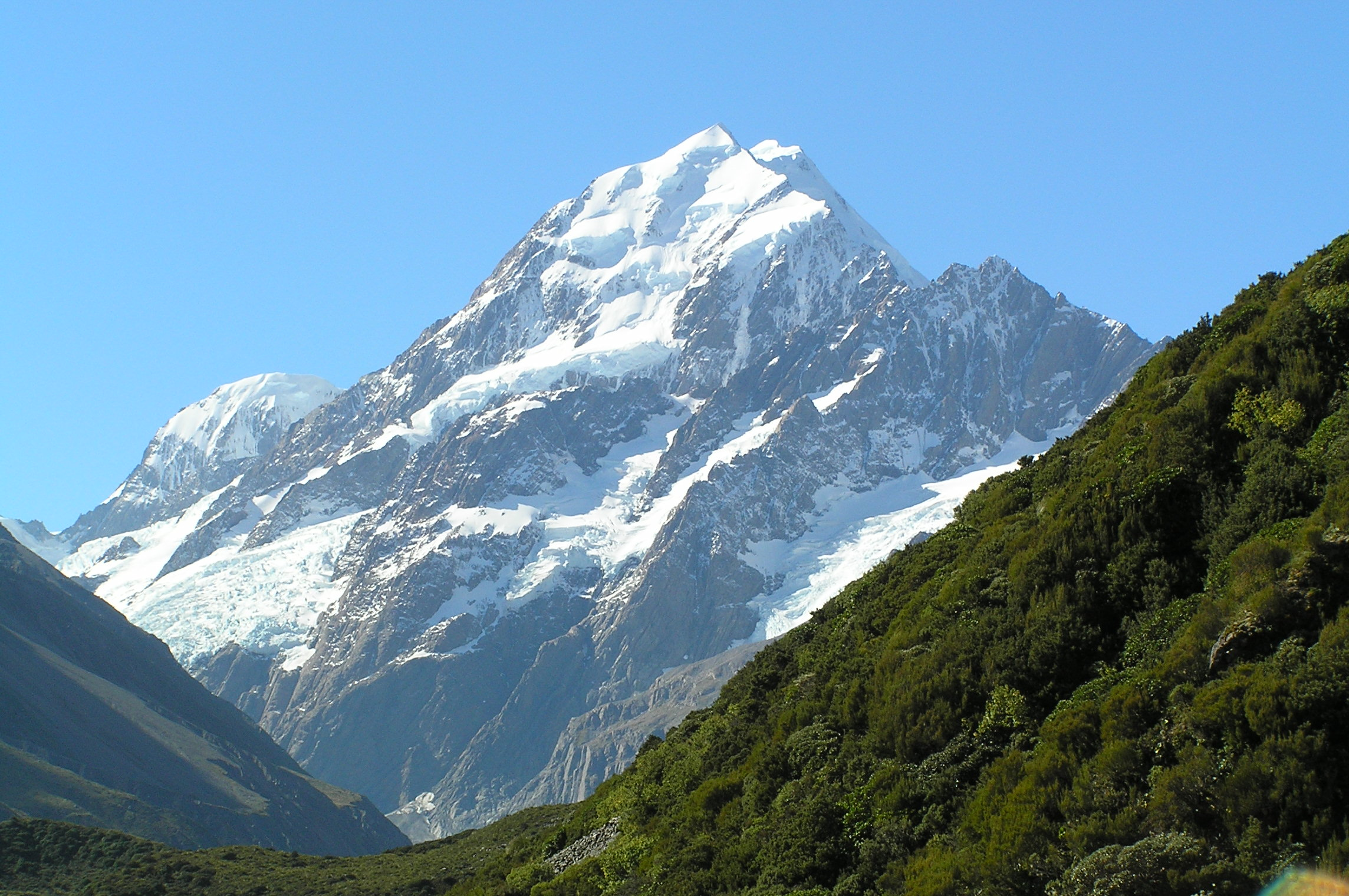
Aoraki / Mount Cook is the tallest mountain in New Zealand.

The South Island, with an area of 150,437 km^{2} (58,084 sq mi), is the largest landmass of New Zealand; it contains about one-quarter of the New Zealand population and is the world's 12th-largest island. It is divided along its length by the Southern Alps, the highest peak of which is Aoraki / Mount Cook at 3,724 metres (12,218 ft), making it 9th-highest island, with the high Kaikōura Ranges to the northeast. There are eighteen peaks of more than 3,000 metres (9,800 ft) in the South Island. The east side of the island is home to the Canterbury Plains while the West Coast is famous for its rough coastlines such as Fiordland, a very high proportion of native bush, and Fox and Franz Josef Glaciers. The dramatic landscape of the South Island has made it a popular location for the production of several films, including The Lord of the Rings trilogy and The Chronicles of Narnia: The Lion, the Witch and the Wardrobe. It lies at similar latitudes to Tasmania (an island south of the Australian mainland), and parts of Patagonia in South America.

== Geology and earthquakes ==
On 4 September 2010, the South Island was struck by a 7.1 magnitude earthquake, which caused extensive damage, several power outages, and many reports of aftershocks. Five and a half months later, 22 February Christchurch earthquake of 6.3 magnitude caused far more additional damage in Christchurch, resulting in 181 deaths. This quake struck at about lunchtime and was centred closer at Lyttelton, and shallower than the prior quake, consequently causing extensive damage.

The Alpine Fault runs through most of the South Island, The last major earthquake on the fault was in 1717, and it is likely that another one will occur in the next fifty years. Previous earthquakes have also occurred on the Apline Fault.

== Climate ==
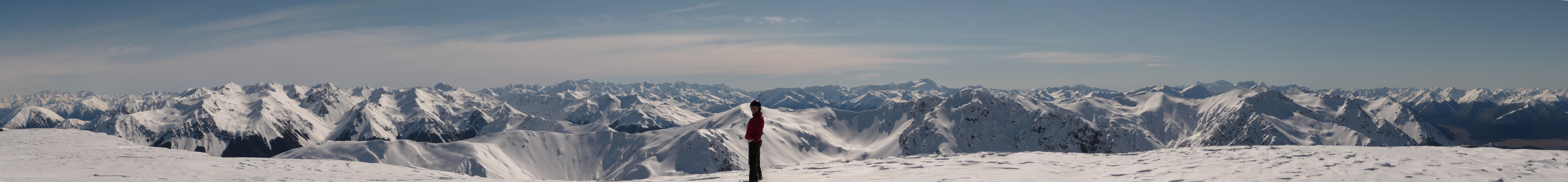
Panoramic view of some of the Southern Alps in winter from the summit of Hamilton Peak in the Craigieburn Range

The climate in the South Island is mostly temperate. The mean temperature for the South Island is 8 °C (46 °F). January and February are the warmest months while July is the coldest. Historical maxima and minima are 42.4 °C (108.3 °F) in Rangiora, Canterbury and −21.6 °C (−6.9 °F) in Ophir, Otago.

Conditions vary sharply across the regions from extremely wet on the West Coast to semi-arid in the Mackenzie Basin of inland Canterbury. Most areas have between 600 and 1,600 mm (24–63 in) of rainfall with the most rain along the West Coast and the least rain on the East Coast, predominantly on the Canterbury Plains. Christchurch is the driest city, receiving about 640 millimetres (25 in) of rain per year while Invercargill is the wettest, receiving about 1,150 millimetres (45 in). The southern and south-western parts of South Island have a cooler and cloudier climate, with around 1,400–1,600 hours of sunshine annually; the northern and north-eastern parts of the South Island are the sunniest areas and receive about 2,400–2,500 hours.

=== Climate data ===
Climate data for Christchurch (Köppen Cfb)
Month	Jan	Feb	Mar	Apr	May	Jun	Jul	Aug	Sep	Oct	Nov	Dec	Year
Record high °C (°F)	37.1 (98.8)	41.6 (106.9)	35.9 (96.6)	29.9 (85.8)	27.3 (81.1)	22.5 (72.5)	22.4 (72.3)	22.8 (73.0)	26.2 (79.2)	30.1 (86.2)	32.0 (89.6)	36.0 (96.8)	41.6 (106.9)
Mean maximum °C (°F)	31.0 (87.8)	31.4 (88.5)	28.7 (83.7)	25.4 (77.7)	22.1 (71.8)	20.3 (68.5)	18.2 (64.8)	19.7 (67.5)	22.3 (72.1)	25.0 (77.0)	27.2 (81.0)	29.8 (85.6)	33.9 (93.0)
Mean daily maximum °C (°F)	22.7 (72.9)	22.3 (72.1)	20.3 (68.5)	17.6 (63.7)	14.6 (58.3)	11.9 (53.4)	11.4 (52.5)	12.6 (54.7)	15.0 (59.0)	16.9 (62.4)	19.2 (66.6)	21.0 (69.8)	17.1 (62.8)
Daily mean °C (°F)	17.1 (62.8)	17.0 (62.6)	14.9 (58.8)	12.2 (54.0)	9.6 (49.3)	6.9 (44.4)	6.3 (43.3)	7.6 (45.7)	9.5 (49.1)	11.2 (52.2)	13.5 (56.3)	15.7 (60.3)	11.8 (53.2)
Mean daily minimum °C (°F)	11.7 (53.1)	11.6 (52.9)	9.7 (49.5)	6.8 (44.2)	4.5 (40.1)	1.8 (35.2)	1.2 (34.2)	2.5 (36.5)	3.9 (39.0)	5.5 (41.9)	7.7 (45.9)	10.5 (50.9)	6.5 (43.7)
Mean minimum °C (°F)	5.0 (41.0)	4.6 (40.3)	2.3 (36.1)	−0.1 (31.8)	−1.9 (28.6)	−4.7 (23.5)	−4.9 (23.2)	−3.7 (25.3)	−2.3 (27.9)	−0.7 (30.7)	0.1 (32.2)	3.7 (38.7)	−5.3 (22.5)
Record low °C (°F)	3.0 (37.4)	1.5 (34.7)	−0.2 (31.6)	−4.0 (24.8)	−6.4 (20.5)	−7.2 (19.0)	−6.8 (19.8)	−6.7 (19.9)	−4.4 (24.1)	−4.2 (24.4)	−2.6 (27.3)	0.1 (32.2)	−7.2 (19.0)
Average rainfall mm (inches)	37 (1.5)	41 (1.6)	41 (1.6)	55 (2.2)	56 (2.2)	61 (2.4)	57 (2.2)	51 (2.0)	36 (1.4)	49 (1.9)	41 (1.6)	52 (2.0)	577 (22.7)
Average rainy days (≥ 1.0 mm)	5.9	5.4	6.3	6.7	7.8	8.0	8.2	7.3	6.1	6.9	6.6	7.1	82.3
Average relative humidity (%) (at 9 am)	72.5	79.0	80.9	83.9	86.3	87.2	87.8	85.8	78.7	73.9	70.5	71.3	79.8
Mean monthly sunshine hours	237.9	195.0	191.2	162.6	139.7	117.1	127.1	153.9	169.5	203.8	223.7	219.9	2,141.4
Percentage possible sunshine	51	49	50	50	47	44	44	48	48	50	51	46	48
Source 1: CliFlo
Source 2: Time and Date (potential monthly daylight hours)

Climate data for Dunedin (Köppen Cfb)
Month	Jan	Feb	Mar	Apr	May	Jun	Jul	Aug	Sep	Oct	Nov	Dec	Year
Mean daily maximum °C (°F)	18.9 (66.0)	18.6 (65.5)	17.3 (63.1)	15.3 (59.5)	12.7 (54.9)	10.6 (51.1)	10.0 (50.0)	11.2 (52.2)	13.2 (55.8)	14.7 (58.5)	16.1 (61.0)	17.3 (63.1)	14.6 (58.3)
Daily mean °C (°F)	15.3 (59.5)	15.0 (59.0)	13.7 (56.7)	11.7 (53.1)	9.3 (48.7)	7.3 (45.1)	6.6 (43.9)	7.7 (45.9)	9.5 (49.1)	10.9 (51.6)	12.4 (54.3)	13.9 (57.0)	11.1 (52.0)
Mean daily minimum °C (°F)	11.6 (52.9)	11.5 (52.7)	10.2 (50.4)	8.2 (46.8)	5.9 (42.6)	4.0 (39.2)	3.1 (37.6)	4.2 (39.6)	5.9 (42.6)	7.2 (45.0)	8.6 (47.5)	10.4 (50.7)	7.6 (45.7)
Average precipitation mm (inches)	72.9 (2.87)	67.8 (2.67)	64.0 (2.52)	50.9 (2.00)	64.7 (2.55)	57.9 (2.28)	57.1 (2.25)	55.7 (2.19)	48.3 (1.90)	61.7 (2.43)	56.4 (2.22)	80.2 (3.16)	737.6 (29.04)
Average precipitation days (≥ 1.0 mm)	9.7	8.5	8.9	8.3	9.8	9.4	9.3	9.6	8.7	10.1	10.0	12.0	114.2
Average relative humidity (%)	74.2	77.6	77.1	76.9	79.5	79.7	80.2	77.6	72.1	71.6	70.6	73.2	75.9
Mean monthly sunshine hours	179.6	158.0	146.1	125.9	108.4	95.3	110.6	122.2	136.8	165.5	166.9	168.3	1,683.7
Source: NIWA Climate Data

Climate data for Alexandra (Köppen BSk)
Month	Jan	Feb	Mar	Apr	May	Jun	Jul	Aug	Sep	Oct	Nov	Dec	Year
Record high °C (°F)	39 (102)	39 (102)	34 (93)	28 (82)	26 (79)	21 (70)	20 (68)	22 (72)	29 (84)	30 (86)	33 (91)	36 (97)	39 (102)
Mean maximum °C (°F)	33.4 (92.1)	33.3 (91.9)	30.5 (86.9)	25.4 (77.7)	21.1 (70.0)	17.6 (63.7)	17.4 (63.3)	19.2 (66.6)	23.9 (75.0)	27.1 (80.8)	29.6 (85.3)	33.1 (91.6)	35.3 (95.5)
Mean daily maximum °C (°F)	25.1 (77.2)	24.8 (76.6)	22.3 (72.1)	18.0 (64.4)	13.6 (56.5)	8.8 (47.8)	8.1 (46.6)	12.5 (54.5)	16.4 (61.5)	19.0 (66.2)	21.1 (70.0)	23.3 (73.9)	17.7 (63.9)
Daily mean °C (°F)	18.0 (64.4)	17.4 (63.3)	14.9 (58.8)	10.9 (51.6)	7.6 (45.7)	3.6 (38.5)	2.9 (37.2)	6.0 (42.8)	9.3 (48.7)	11.7 (53.1)	14.0 (57.2)	16.3 (61.3)	11.0 (51.8)
Mean daily minimum °C (°F)	10.8 (51.4)	10.1 (50.2)	7.3 (45.1)	3.8 (38.8)	1.5 (34.7)	−1.5 (29.3)	−2.4 (27.7)	−0.5 (31.1)	2.2 (36.0)	4.4 (39.9)	6.7 (44.1)	9.3 (48.7)	4.3 (39.7)
Mean minimum °C (°F)	3.1 (37.6)	3.4 (38.1)	0.5 (32.9)	−2.8 (27.0)	−5.3 (22.5)	−6.9 (19.6)	−7.8 (18.0)	−6.7 (19.9)	−4.4 (24.1)	−2.6 (27.3)	−0.4 (31.3)	2.6 (36.7)	−8.3 (17.1)
Record low °C (°F)	0 (32)	1 (34)	−2 (28)	−5 (23)	−11 (12)	−10 (14)	−12 (10)	−9 (16)	−7 (19)	−4 (25)	−3 (27)	0 (32)	−12 (10)
Average precipitation mm (inches)	50.1 (1.97)	32.8 (1.29)	29.0 (1.14)	22.0 (0.87)	27.4 (1.08)	31.6 (1.24)	24.2 (0.95)	17.6 (0.69)	20.9 (0.82)	28.7 (1.13)	30.6 (1.20)	44.5 (1.75)	359.4 (14.15)
Average precipitation days (≥ 1.0 mm)	6.7	5.2	4.9	4.0	6.9	5.8	4.3	4.4	5.4	5.5	4.8	7.7	65.7
Average relative humidity (%)	70.1	77.5	80.0	84.5	86.8	89.1	89.3	85.1	74.5	72.7	67.8	69.0	78.9
Mean monthly sunshine hours	231.4	199.8	193.7	158.2	121.2	87.1	90.7	135.9	164.7	193.9	214.1	215.0	2,005.8
Source 1: NIWA Climate Data
Source 2: CliFlo

Climate data for Milford Sound (Köppen Cfb)
Month	Jan	Feb	Mar	Apr	May	Jun	Jul	Aug	Sep	Oct	Nov	Dec	Year
Record high °C (°F)	28.3 (82.9)	28.2 (82.8)	27.4 (81.3)	23.7 (74.7)	20.7 (69.3)	17.7 (63.9)	16.9 (62.4)	18.9 (66.0)	20.8 (69.4)	23.4 (74.1)	25.9 (78.6)	27.7 (81.9)	28.3 (82.9)
Mean daily maximum °C (°F)	18.7 (65.7)	19.0 (66.2)	17.7 (63.9)	15.5 (59.9)	12.4 (54.3)	9.5 (49.1)	9.3 (48.7)	11.2 (52.2)	12.9 (55.2)	14.3 (57.7)	15.7 (60.3)	17.5 (63.5)	14.5 (58.1)
Daily mean °C (°F)	14.5 (58.1)	14.7 (58.5)	13.5 (56.3)	11.2 (52.2)	8.4 (47.1)	5.8 (42.4)	5.4 (41.7)	6.8 (44.2)	8.5 (47.3)	10.1 (50.2)	11.6 (52.9)	13.5 (56.3)	10.4 (50.7)
Mean daily minimum °C (°F)	10.3 (50.5)	10.4 (50.7)	9.2 (48.6)	6.9 (44.4)	4.4 (39.9)	2.1 (35.8)	1.5 (34.7)	2.4 (36.3)	4.1 (39.4)	5.9 (42.6)	7.5 (45.5)	9.5 (49.1)	6.2 (43.2)
Record low °C (°F)	3.5 (38.3)	2.8 (37.0)	0.5 (32.9)	−1.7 (28.9)	−3 (27)	−4.3 (24.3)	−6.1 (21.0)	−3.3 (26.1)	−2.2 (28.0)	−1 (30)	0.2 (32.4)	1.5 (34.7)	−6.1 (21.0)
Average rainfall mm (inches)	632.8 (24.91)	499.6 (19.67)	601.1 (23.67)	548.1 (21.58)	566.4 (22.30)	424.1 (16.70)	393.9 (15.51)	428.7 (16.88)	540.1 (21.26)	631.3 (24.85)	566.6 (22.31)	595.0 (23.43)	6,412.2 (252.45)
Average rainy days (≥ 1.0 mm)	15.7	13.1	14.7	14.7	15.5	14.0	13.8	15.3	16.5	18.0	16.2	16.5	183.9
Average relative humidity (%) (at 9am)	87.5	90.1	91.3	91.9	91.6	91.6	91.0	90.7	90.2	88.2	85.5	85.3	89.6
Source: CliFlo

Climate data for Queenstown (Köppen Cfb)
Month	Jan	Feb	Mar	Apr	May	Jun	Jul	Aug	Sep	Oct	Nov	Dec	Year
Record high °C (°F)	33.4 (92.1)	32.2 (90.0)	30.0 (86.0)	25.1 (77.2)	21.3 (70.3)	19.4 (66.9)	17.0 (62.6)	19.7 (67.5)	23.3 (73.9)	26.0 (78.8)	28.5 (83.3)	30.0 (86.0)	33.4 (92.1)
Mean daily maximum °C (°F)	21.7 (71.1)	21.5 (70.7)	18.7 (65.7)	15.1 (59.2)	11.5 (52.7)	8.3 (46.9)	7.7 (45.9)	9.9 (49.8)	12.9 (55.2)	15.3 (59.5)	17.6 (63.7)	19.8 (67.6)	15.0 (59.0)
Daily mean °C (°F)	15.7 (60.3)	15.4 (59.7)	13.0 (55.4)	9.6 (49.3)	6.7 (44.1)	3.9 (39.0)	3.1 (37.6)	5.0 (41.0)	7.6 (45.7)	9.8 (49.6)	11.9 (53.4)	14.1 (57.4)	9.7 (49.5)
Mean daily minimum °C (°F)	9.7 (49.5)	9.3 (48.7)	7.3 (45.1)	4.2 (39.6)	2.0 (35.6)	−0.6 (30.9)	−1.6 (29.1)	0.1 (32.2)	2.3 (36.1)	4.3 (39.7)	6.2 (43.2)	8.4 (47.1)	4.3 (39.7)
Record low °C (°F)	0.3 (32.5)	0.5 (32.9)	−1.6 (29.1)	−4.5 (23.9)	−8.8 (16.2)	−10.3 (13.5)	−8.9 (16.0)	−7.8 (18.0)	−5.0 (23.0)	−4.2 (24.4)	−2.1 (28.2)	−0.4 (31.3)	−10.3 (13.5)
Average precipitation mm (inches)	63.9 (2.52)	48.1 (1.89)	52.7 (2.07)	56.0 (2.20)	70.1 (2.76)	72.1 (2.84)	49.2 (1.94)	68.7 (2.70)	66.8 (2.63)	65.6 (2.58)	67.6 (2.66)	76.4 (3.01)	757.2 (29.81)
Average precipitation days (≥ 1.0 mm)	7.2	6.2	7.4	7.4	9.0	9.2	6.9	9.1	8.5	8.8	7.6	9.6	96.9
Average relative humidity (%)	70.2	74.3	75.8	78.4	81.1	83.8	83.3	80.5	73.1	70.9	67.5	69.4	75.7
Mean monthly sunshine hours	230.3	207.3	187.0	145.4	87.8	71.8	88.3	120.0	153.6	197.7	216.6	223.5	1,929.2
Source 1: NIWA Climate Data
Source 2: CliFlo

Climate data for Invercargill (Köppen Cfb)
Month	Jan	Feb	Mar	Apr	May	Jun	Jul	Aug	Sep	Oct	Nov	Dec	Year
Record high °C (°F)	33.8 (92.8)	32.1 (89.8)	28.8 (83.8)	25.5 (77.9)	20.9 (69.6)	18.4 (65.1)	16.7 (62.1)	21.0 (69.8)	23.1 (73.6)	24.6 (76.3)	27.5 (81.5)	28.8 (83.8)	33.8 (92.8)
Mean daily maximum °C (°F)	18.7 (65.7)	18.6 (65.5)	17.1 (62.8)	14.9 (58.8)	12.3 (54.1)	10.0 (50.0)	9.5 (49.1)	11.1 (52.0)	13.1 (55.6)	14.4 (57.9)	15.8 (60.4)	17.5 (63.5)	14.4 (57.9)
Daily mean °C (°F)	14.2 (57.6)	13.9 (57.0)	12.5 (54.5)	10.4 (50.7)	8.0 (46.4)	5.9 (42.6)	5.3 (41.5)	6.6 (43.9)	8.5 (47.3)	9.9 (49.8)	11.4 (52.5)	13.0 (55.4)	10.0 (50.0)
Mean daily minimum °C (°F)	9.6 (49.3)	9.3 (48.7)	7.9 (46.2)	5.8 (42.4)	3.8 (38.8)	1.9 (35.4)	1.0 (33.8)	2.2 (36.0)	4.0 (39.2)	5.4 (41.7)	7.0 (44.6)	8.6 (47.5)	5.5 (41.9)
Record low °C (°F)	−0.9 (30.4)	−2.4 (27.7)	−2.4 (27.7)	−4.9 (23.2)	−6.9 (19.6)	−7.4 (18.7)	−9.0 (15.8)	−8.0 (17.6)	−4.5 (23.9)	−3.2 (26.2)	−2.0 (28.4)	−0.4 (31.3)	−9.0 (15.8)
Average precipitation mm (inches)	115.0 (4.53)	87.1 (3.43)	97.4 (3.83)	95.9 (3.78)	114.4 (4.50)	104.0 (4.09)	85.2 (3.35)	75.6 (2.98)	84.2 (3.31)	95.0 (3.74)	90.4 (3.56)	105.0 (4.13)	1,149.3 (45.25)
Average precipitation days (≥ 1.0 mm)	13.0	10.3	12.3	12.3	15.3	15.6	14.2	12.8	13.1	13.8	13.3	14.3	160.4
Average relative humidity (%)	80.6	83.3	84.2	85.3	87.0	87.7	88.1	85.8	81.3	80.0	78.2	78.6	83.3
Mean monthly sunshine hours	185.9	167.2	142.6	117.2	87.5	78.7	97.9	123.0	139.8	173.0	181.3	188.2	1,682.2
Source 1: NIWA Climate Data
Source 2: Météo Climat

=== Climate change ===
Atmospheric carbon dioxide record from Baring Head, Wellington, from 1977 to present.

Climate change in New Zealand involves historical, current and future changes in the climate of New Zealand; and New Zealand's contribution and response to global climate change. Summers are becoming longer and hotter, and some glaciers have melted completely and others have shrunk. In 2021, the Ministry for the Environment estimated that New Zealand's gross emissions were 0.17% of the world's total gross greenhouse gas emissions. However, on a per capita basis, New Zealand is a significant emitter, the sixth highest within the Annex I countries, whereas on absolute gross emissions New Zealand is ranked as the 24th highest emitter.

More than half (53%) of New Zealand's gross greenhouse gas emissions are from agriculture, mainly methane from sheep and cow belches. Between 1990 and 2022, New Zealand's gross emissions (excluding removals from land use and forestry) increased by 14%. When the uptake of carbon dioxide by forests (sequestration) is taken into account, net emissions (including carbon removals from land use and forestry) increased by 33% since 1990.

Climate change is being responded to in a variety of ways by civil society and the New Zealand Government. This includes participation in international treaties and in social and political debates related to climate change. New Zealand has an emissions trading scheme, and in 2019 the government introduced the Climate Change Response (Zero Carbon) Amendment Bill which created a Climate Change Commission responsible for advising the government on policies and emissions budgets.

New Zealand made a number of pledges on climate change mitigation in 2019: to reduce net carbon emissions to zero by 2050, to plant 1 billion trees by 2028, and to bring pastoral agriculture (farmers) into an emissions price policy by 2025. Already in 2019, New Zealand banned new offshore oil and gas drilling and decided that climate change issues would be examined before every important decision. In early December 2020, Prime Minister Jacinda Ardern declared a climate change emergency and pledged that the New Zealand Government would be carbon neutral by 2025. Key goals and initiatives include requiring the public sector to buy only electric or hybrid vehicles, government buildings will have to meet new "green" building standards, and all 200 coal-fired boilers in public service buildings will be phased out. International assessments of New Zealand's climate change actions are either ranked as "low" on the Climate Change Performance Index or rated as "highly insufficient" by Climate Action Tracker.

== Natural geographic features ==
=== Fiords ===
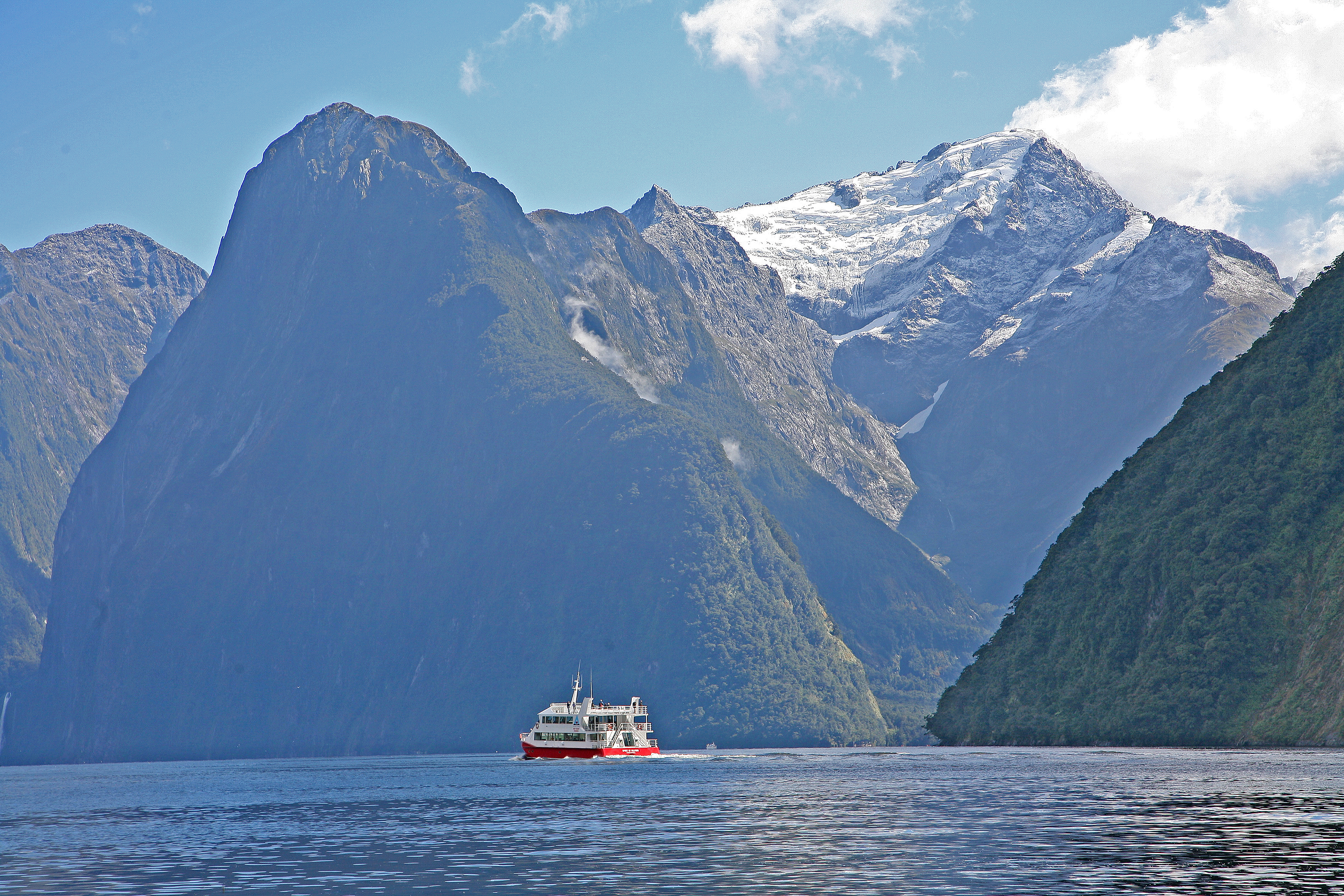
Typical view of Milford Sound / Piopiotahi featuring Mount Pembroke

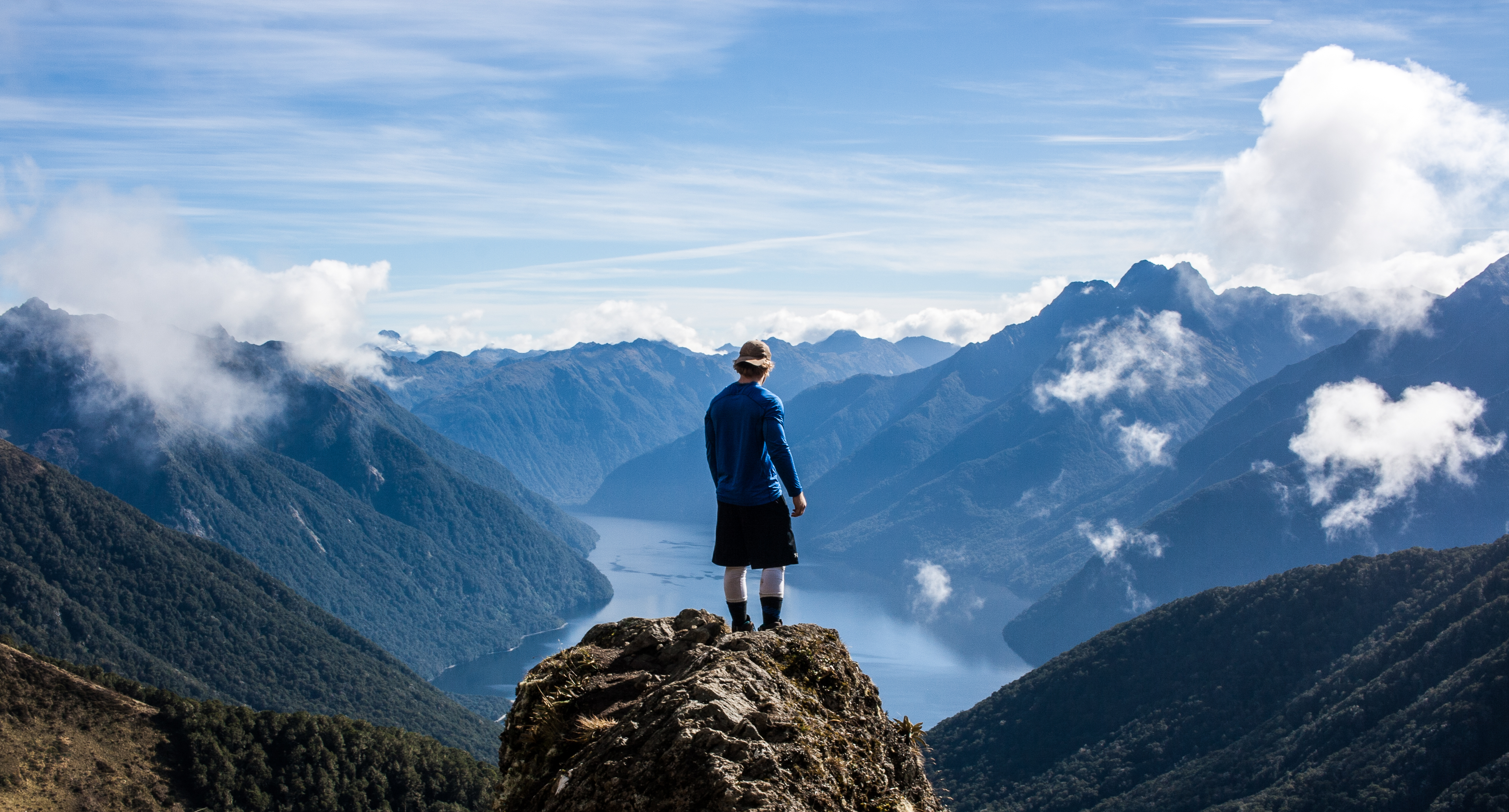
Fiordland National Park

The South Island has 15 named maritime fiords which are all located in the southwest of the island in a mountainous area known as Fiordland. The spelling 'fiord' is used in New Zealand rather than 'fjord', although all the maritime fiords use the word Sound in their name instead.

A number of lakes in the Fiordland and Otago regions also fill glacial valleys. Lake Te Anau has three western arms which are fiords (and are named so). Lake McKerrow / Whakatipu Waitai to the north of Milford Sound / Piopiotahi is a fiord with a silted-up mouth. Lake Wakatipu fills a large glacial valley, as do lakes Hakapoua, Poteriteri, Monowai and Hauroko in the far south of Fiordland. Lake Manapouri has fiords as its west, north and south arms.

The Marlborough Sounds, a series of deep indentations in the coastline at the northern tip of the South Island, are in fact rias, drowned river valleys.

=== Glaciers ===
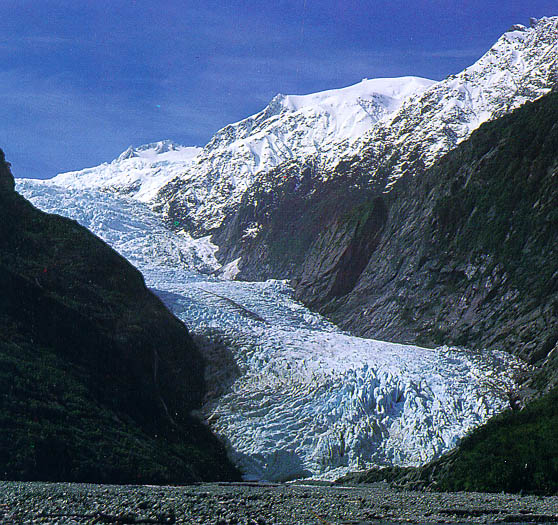
Franz Josef Glacier

Most of New Zealand's glaciers are in the South Island. They are generally found in the Southern Alps near the Main Divide.

An inventory of South Island glaciers during the 1980s indicated there were about 3,155 glaciers with an area of at least one hectare (2.5 acres). About a sixth of these glaciers covered more than 10 hectares. These include the Fox and Franz Josef glaciers on the West Coast, and the Haupapa / Tasman, Hooker, Mueller and Murchison glaciers in the east.

=== Lakes ===
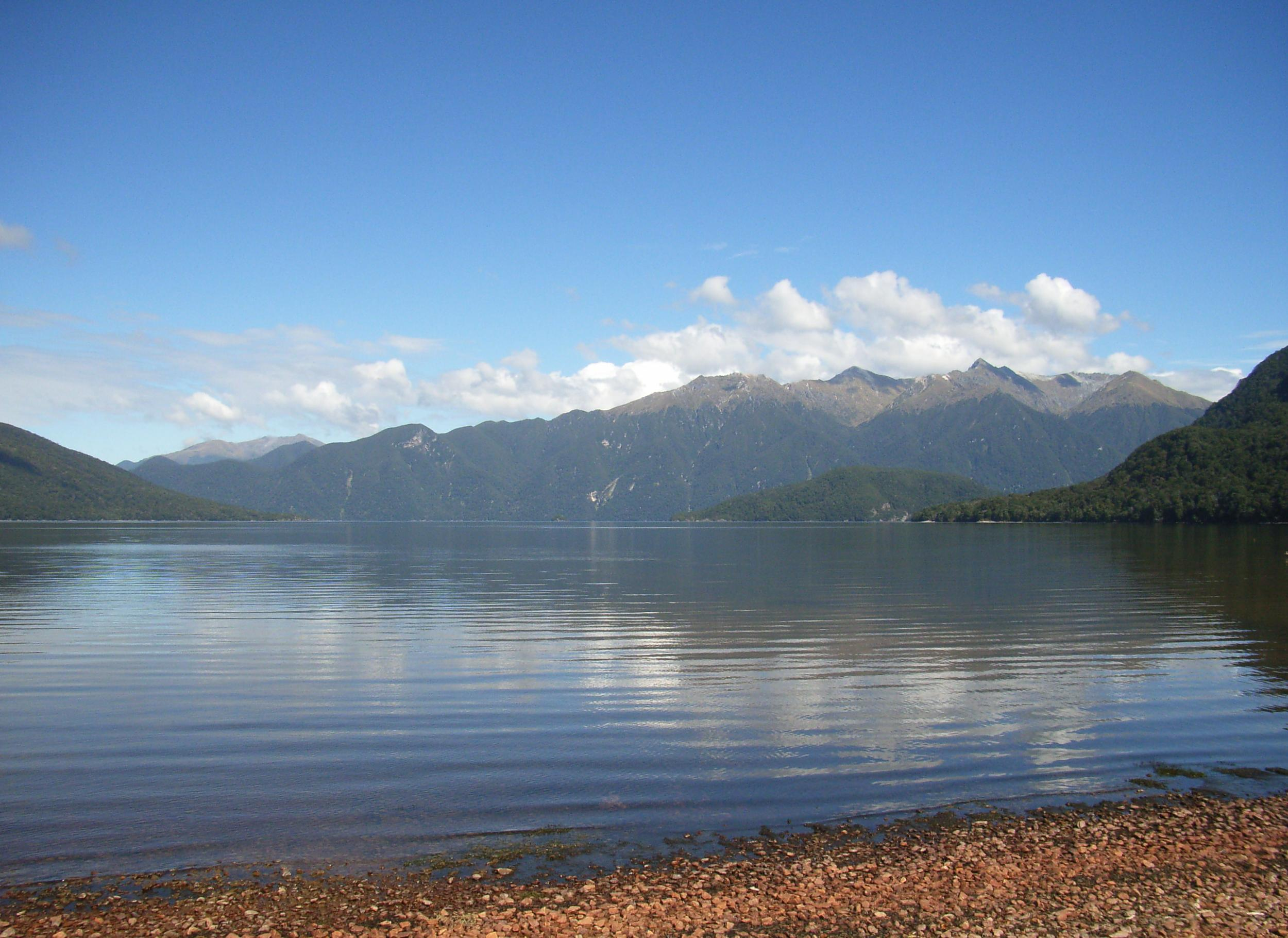
Lake Hauroko

There are some 3,820 lakes in New Zealand with a surface area larger than one hectare. Much of the higher country in the South Island was covered by ice during the glacial periods of the last two million years. Advancing glaciers eroded large steep-sided valleys, and often carried piles of moraine (rocks and soil) that acted as natural dams. When the glaciers retreated, they left basins that are now filled by lakes. The level of most glacial lakes in the upper parts of the Waitaki and Clutha / Mata-Au rivers are controlled for electricity generation. Hydroelectric reservoirs are common in South Canterbury and Central Otago, the largest of which is Lake Benmore, on the Waitaki River.

The South Island has 8 of New Zealand's 10 biggest lakes. They were formed by glaciers and include Lake Wakatipu, Lake Tekapo and Lake Manapouri. The deepest (462 m) is Lake Hauroko, in western Southland. It is the 16th deepest lake in the world. Millions of years ago, Central Otago had a huge lake – Lake Manuherikia. It was slowly filled in with mud, and fossils of fish and crocodiles have been found there.

=== Volcanoes ===
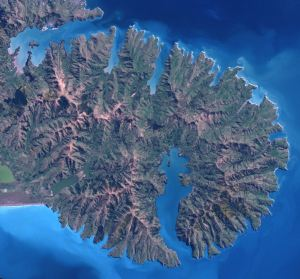
Banks Peninsula is roughly circular, with many bays and two deep harbours

There are four extinct volcanoes in the South Island, all located on the east coast.

Banks Peninsula forms the most prominent of these volcanic features. Geologically, the peninsula comprises the eroded remnants of two large shield volcanoes (Lyttelton formed first, then Akaroa). These formed due to intraplate volcanism between about eleven and eight million years ago (Miocene) on a continental crust. The peninsula formed as offshore islands, with the volcanoes reaching to about 1,500 m above sea level. Two dominant craters formed Lyttelton / Whakaraupō and Akaroa Harbours.

The Canterbury Plains formed from the erosion of the Southern Alps (an extensive and high mountain range caused by the meeting of the Indo-Australian and Pacific tectonic plates) and from the alluvial fans created by large braided rivers. These plains reach their widest point where they meet the hilly sub-region of Banks Peninsula. A layer of loess, a rather unstable fine silt deposited by the foehn winds which bluster across the plains, covers the northern and western flanks of the peninsula. The portion of crater rim lying between Lyttelton Harbour / Whakaraupō and Christchurch city forms the Port Hills.

The Otago Harbour was formed from the drowned remnants of a giant shield volcano, centred close to what is now the town of Port Chalmers. The remains of this violent origin can be seen in the basalt of the surrounding hills. The last eruptive phase ended some ten million years ago, leaving the prominent peak of Mount Cargill.

Timaru was constructed on rolling hills created from the lava flows of the extinct Mount Horrible, which last erupted many thousands of years ago.

=== Te Wāhipounamu World Heritage Site ===
Te Wāhipounamu (Māori for "the place of greenstone") is a World Heritage Site in the south west corner of the South Island.

Inscribed on the World Heritage List in 1990 it covers 26,000 square kilometres (10,000 sq mi) and incorporates the Aoraki / Mount Cook, the Fiordland, the Mount Aspiring and the Westland Tai Poutini National Parks.

It is thought to contain some of the best modern representations of the original flora and fauna present in Gondwanaland, one of the reasons for listing as a World Heritage Site.

== Protected areas ==
=== Forest parks ===
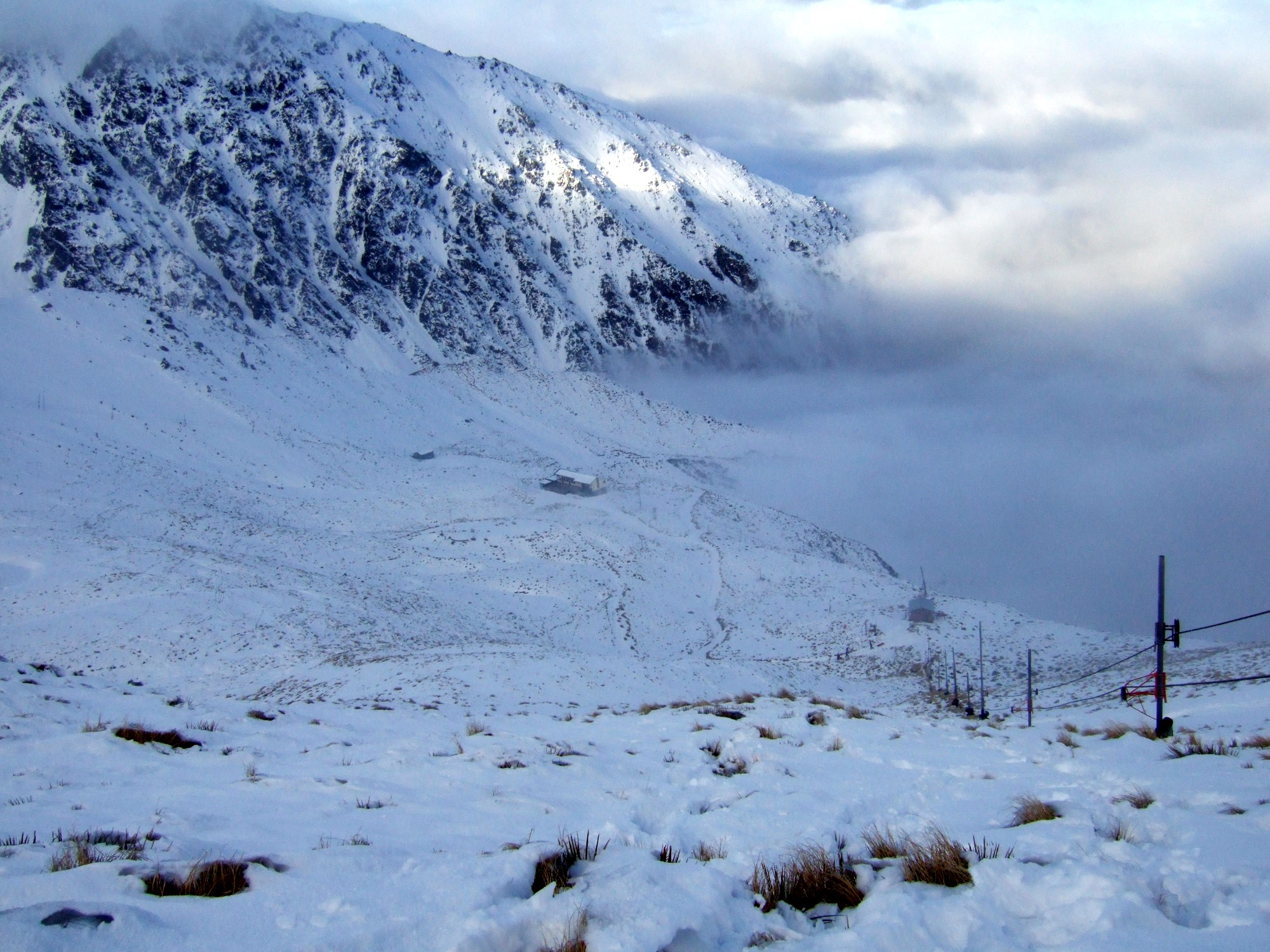
Broken River Ski Area in the Craigieburn Forest Park

There are six forest parks in the South Island that are on public land administered by the Department of Conservation.

Catlins Forest Park
Situated in the Southland region.
Craigieburn Forest Park
Situated in the Canterbury Region, its boundaries lie in part alongside State Highway 73 and is adjacent to the eastern flanks of the Southern Alps. The Broken River Ski Area and the Craigieburn Valley Ski Area lie within its borders. The New Zealand Forest Service had used the area as an experimental forestry area and there is now an environmental issue with the spread of wilding conifers.
Hanmer Forest Park
Situated in the Canterbury Region.
Lake Sumner Forest Park
Situated in the Canterbury Region.
Mount Richmond Forest Park
Situated in the Marlborough region.
Victoria Forest Park
Situated in the West Coast region.

=== National parks ===
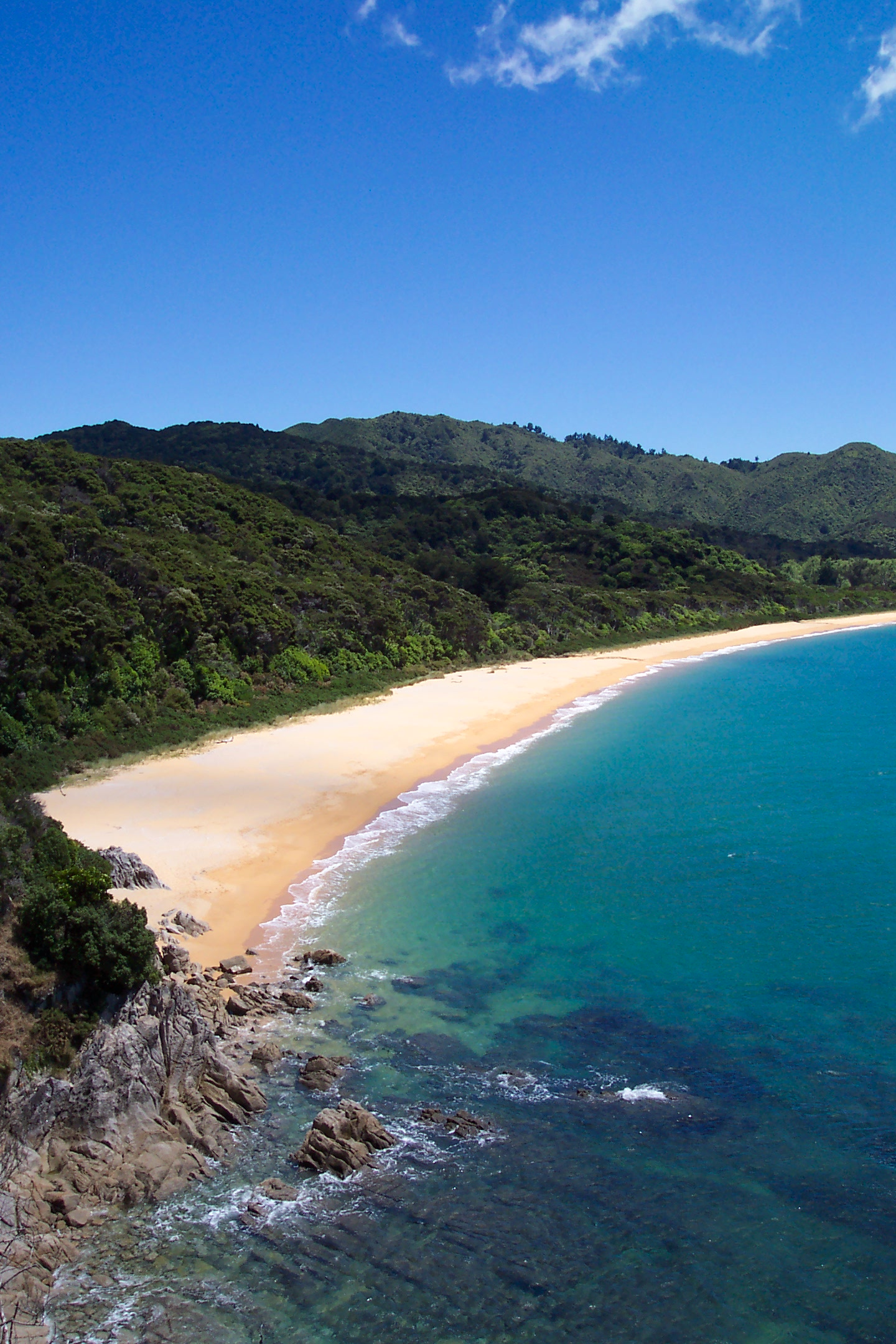
Abel Tasman National Park

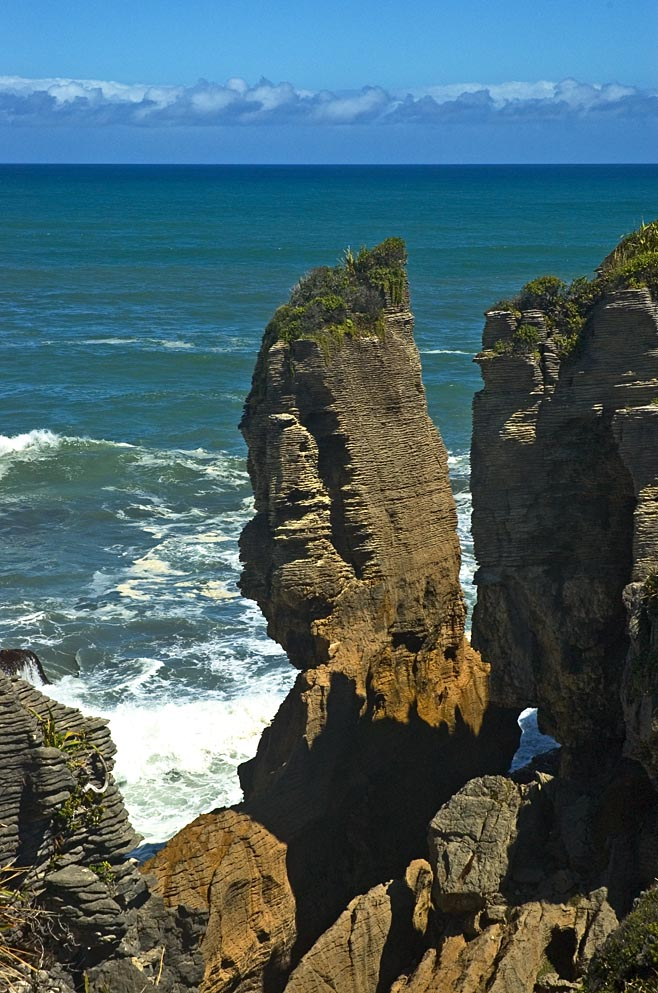
The famous "Pancake Rocks" at Paparoa National Park

The South Island has ten national parks established under the National Parks Act 1980 and which are administered by the Department of Conservation.

From north to south, the National Parks are:

Kahurangi National Park
(4,520 km^{2}, established 1996) Situated in the north-west of the South Island, Kahurangi comprises spectacular and remote country and includes the Heaphy Track. It has ancient landforms and unique flora and fauna. It is New Zealand's second largest national park.
Abel Tasman National Park
(225 km^{2}, established 1942) Has numerous tidal inlets and beaches of golden sand along the shores of Tasman Bay / Te Tai-o-Aorere. It is New Zealand's smallest national park.
Nelson Lakes National Park
(1,018 km^{2}, established 1956) A rugged, mountainous area in Nelson Region. It extends southwards from the forested shores of Lake Rotoiti and Rotoroa to the Lewis Pass National Reserve.
Paparoa National Park
(306 km^{2}, established 1987) On the West Coast of the South Island between Westport and Greymouth. It includes the celebrated Pancake Rocks at Punakaiki.
Arthur's Pass National Park
(1,144 km^{2}, established 1929) A rugged and mountainous area straddling the main divide of the Southern Alps.
Westland Tai Poutini National Park
(1,175 km^{2}, established 1960) Extends from the highest peaks of the Southern Alps to a wild remote coastline. Included in the park are glaciers, scenic lakes and dense rainforest, plus remains of old gold mining towns along the coast.
Aoraki / Mount Cook National Park
(707 km^{2}, established 1953) An alpine park, containing New Zealand's highest mountain, Aoraki / Mount Cook (3,754 m) and its longest glacier, Haupapa / Tasman Glacier (29 km). A focus for mountaineering, ski touring and scenic flights, the park is an area of outstanding natural beauty. Together, the Aoraki / Mount Cook and Westland Tai Poutini National Parks have been declared a World Heritage Site.
Mount Aspiring National Park
(3,555 km^{2}, established 1964) A complex of impressively glaciated mountain scenery centred on Mount Aspiring / Tititea (3,036 m), New Zealand's highest peak outside of the main divide.
Fiordland National Park
(12,519 km^{2}, established 1952) The largest national park in New Zealand and one of the largest in the world. The grandeur of its scenery, with its deep fiords, its lakes of glacial origin, its mountains and waterfalls, has earned it international recognition as a world heritage area.
Rakiura National Park
(1,500 km^{2}, established 2002) On Stewart Island / Rakiura.

Other native reserves and parks

- Hakatere Conservation Park
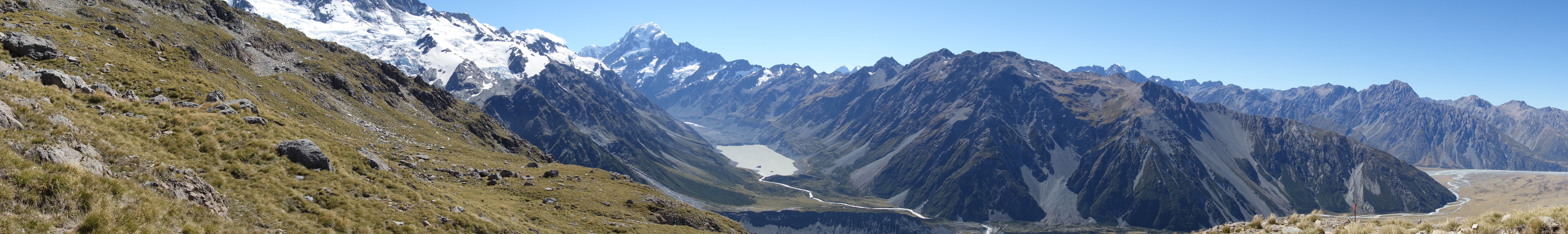
Hooker Valley at Aoraki / Mount Cook National Park, with Aoraki / Mount Cook, the highest mountain in New Zealand at 3,724 metres (12,218 feet), and Hooker Lake in the background

== Natural history ==
During the Last Glacial Period when sea levels were over 100 metres lower than present day levels, the North and South Islands were connected by a vast coastal plain which formed at the South Taranaki Bight. Similarly, the South Island and Stewart Island / Rakiura were connected by coastal plains which covered modern-day Foveaux Strait. During this period, most of the South Island was covered in grassland and glaciers, compared to the woodlands and rainforest which grew in the more temperate North Island. Sea levels began to rise 7,000 years ago, eventually separating the islands and linking the Cook Strait to the Tasman Sea.

=== Birds ===
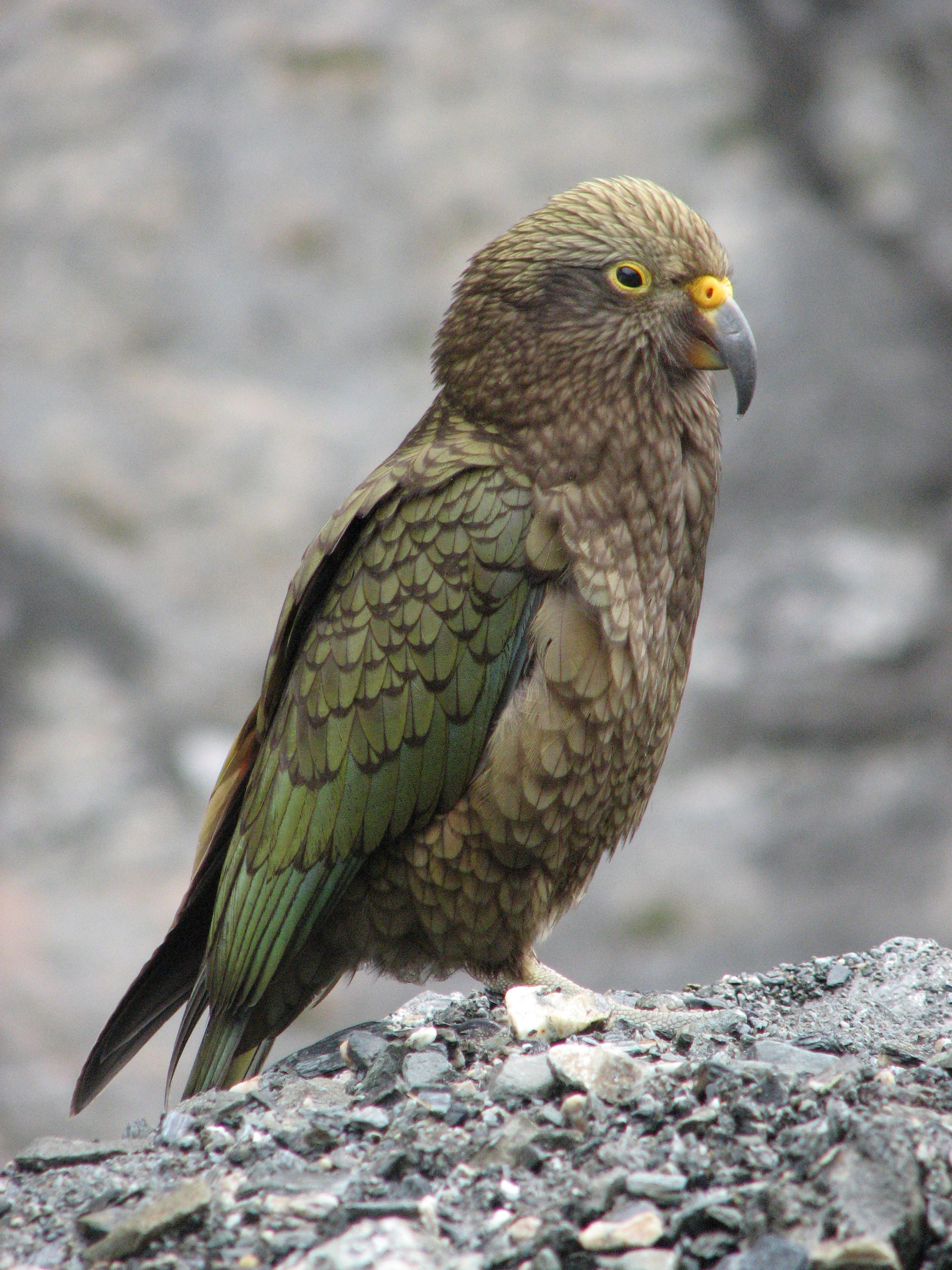
The South Island kea, a species of mountain parrot

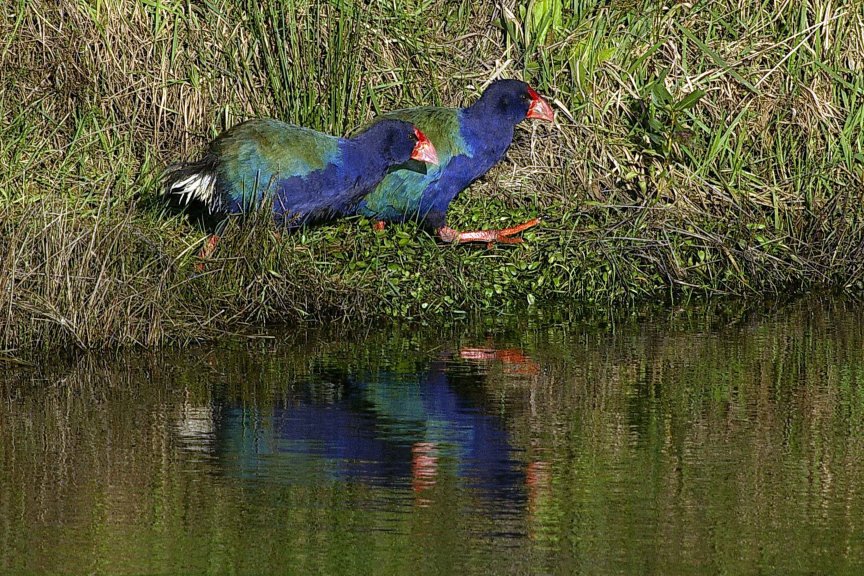
The South Island takahē

There are several bird species which are endemic to the South Island. They include the kea, great spotted kiwi, Okarito brown kiwi, South Island kōkako, South Island pied oystercatcher, Malherbe's parakeet, king shag, takahē, black-fronted tern, South Island robin, rock wren, wrybill, and yellowhead.

Many South Island bird species are now extinct, mainly due to hunting by humans and predation by cats and rats introduced by humans. Extinct species include the South Island goose, South Island giant moa, Haast's eagle and South Island piopio.

== See also ==
- North Island
- Geography of New Zealand
- Climate of New Zealand
- Geography of North Island
