= The Hatchling =

Flying puppet

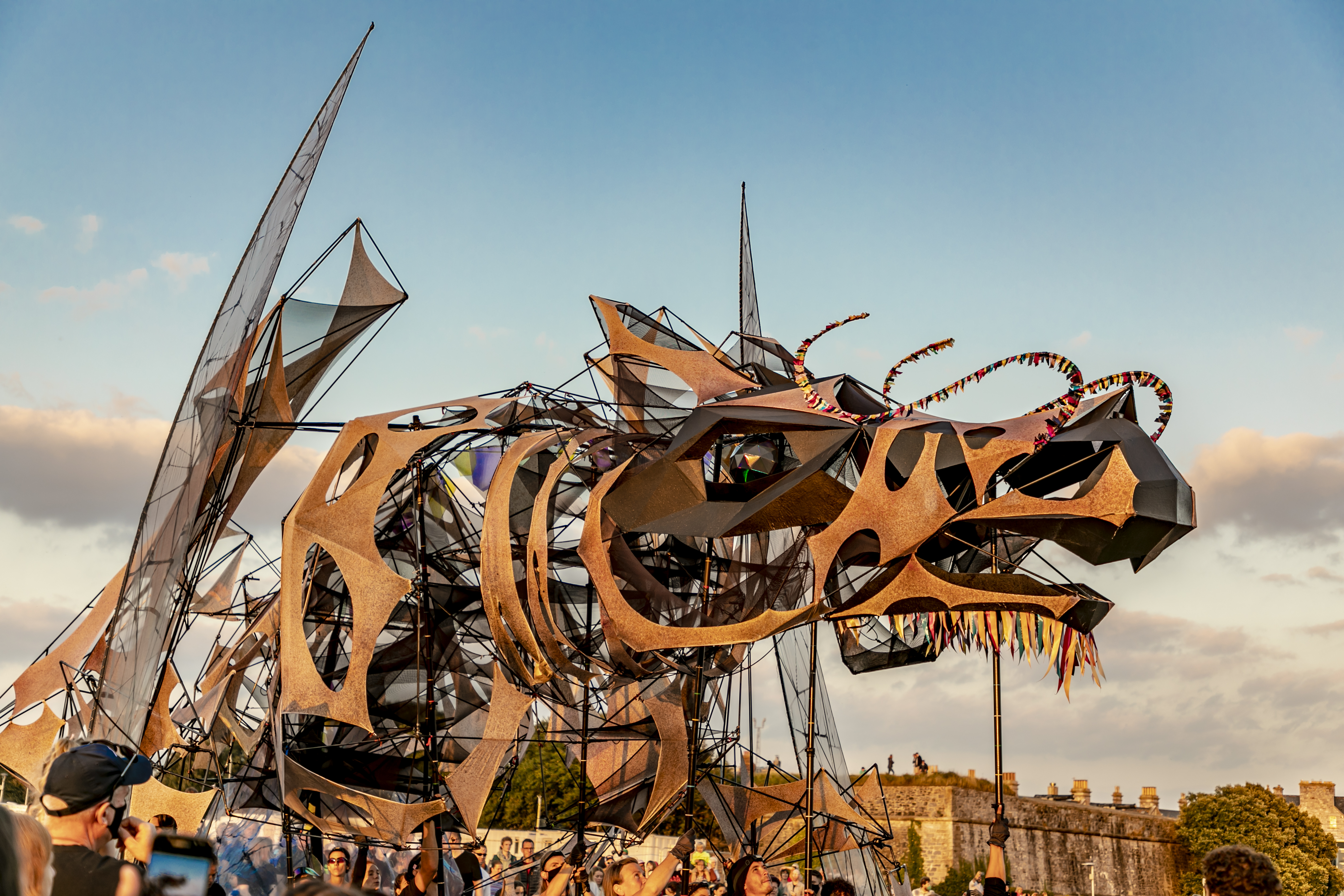
- The Hatchling, by Damian Pudner 2021
- Date: August 28–29, 2021
- Location: Plymouth, England
- Type: Performance art
- Motive: Street entertainment, kite-flying, freedom and hope
- Organised by: Trigger Productions Limited, of (Bristol)
- Website: www.thehatchling.co.uk

The Hatchling is a giant puppet dragon of kite construction; created for street theatre, performance art, procession and flight. It was created by producer Angie Bual, director and puppetry specialist Mervyn Millar and designer Carl Robertshaw, and is produced by Trigger Productions Limited of Bristol, England. It premiered at a 2021 event in Plymouth, Devon, when the Hatchling processed through the streets, and was then flown as a kite over Plymouth Sound. The Hatchling also presented at The Queen's Platinum Jubilee Pageant, on 5 June 2022, leading a procession of 5,000 street performers along The Mall, London.

The Hatchling is controlled by rods when in procession, and it can be kite-flown by lines held by a ship, over the sea. It has a wingspan of 20 metres (65.6 feet), and it is "the size of a double-decker bus". In 2021, according to The Times it was "the largest [puppet] ever to be powered by people".

== World premiere in Plymouth ==
The event was heralded thus in the Devon Daily newspaper:

The Hatchling will be one of the highlight events of Mayflower 400, the year-long programme marking the 400th anniversary of the Mayflower’s historic voyage from Plymouth to Massachusetts, offering an opportunity to explore ideas of freedom of movement, tolerance and home through a shared theatrical experience.

The Hatchling street performance in Plymouth, Devon, was originally scheduled for 14–15 August 2021, but was postponed "as a mark of respect to the community and families involved in the tragic incident in Keyham on 12 August". In Plymouth's city centre, between Saturday 28 and Sunday 29 August 2021, The Hatchling hatched from an egg and built a nest, attained the dimensions of a double-decker bus, (Note: To support the illusion of growth and transformation, there are in reality two Hatchling puppets: a smaller one representing the dragon chick, and a larger one representing the same dragon as an adult.) and took wing from Plymouth Hoe, over Plymouth Sound. The puppet roamed the city, explored its surroundings and interacted with the public. Performances by local groups were included in the schedule. Over 30,000 people attended the event. Poets Rebecca Tantony, Chris White and Shagufta K. Iqbal performed pieces on the subject of dragon mythology.

=== Flight ===
On the Sunday evening the puppet underwent a metamorphosis from rod-controlled puppet to kite, and from dragon to bird, unfurling her wings for the first time. She flew over Plymouth Sound. as an "uplifting symbol of freedom".

There was a practice session beforehand, using the smaller Hatchling kite-puppet. Then on 29 August the full-sized kite puppet was launched from the Hoe. The floodlit kite was towed by the vessel St Nicholas and escorted by the tug Prince Rock, while flying from West Hoe Bay to Barn Pool in Plymouth, then recovered from shore. Sandra Smith of The Lost Sound described the launch:

Dusk turned into night time and the field was lit up with white search lights and the dragon became iridescent. The dragon grew wings and a new body - stronger and fixed, to lift into the air. All the time the puppeteers were like worker ants carrying back and forth creating the new body. The puppeteers got her ready to lift, to fly; and with no wind at all that night, they had to get her to elevate. They were running, lifting her up, but she bounced back down, unable to catch any breeze. Many times she nearly got off the ground, to roars from the crowd, but she couldn't get high enough to fly and then, suddenly, there was enough breeze and she lifted, haltingly, unsteadily, but she began to rise. The crowd erupted, cheered, whooped and willed her to ascend. Slowly she hovered and then began to turn and fly up. She hung in the air above the field for a long time looking down on us, part bird, part crucifix, a symbol of hope, of freedom and of daring to dream big!

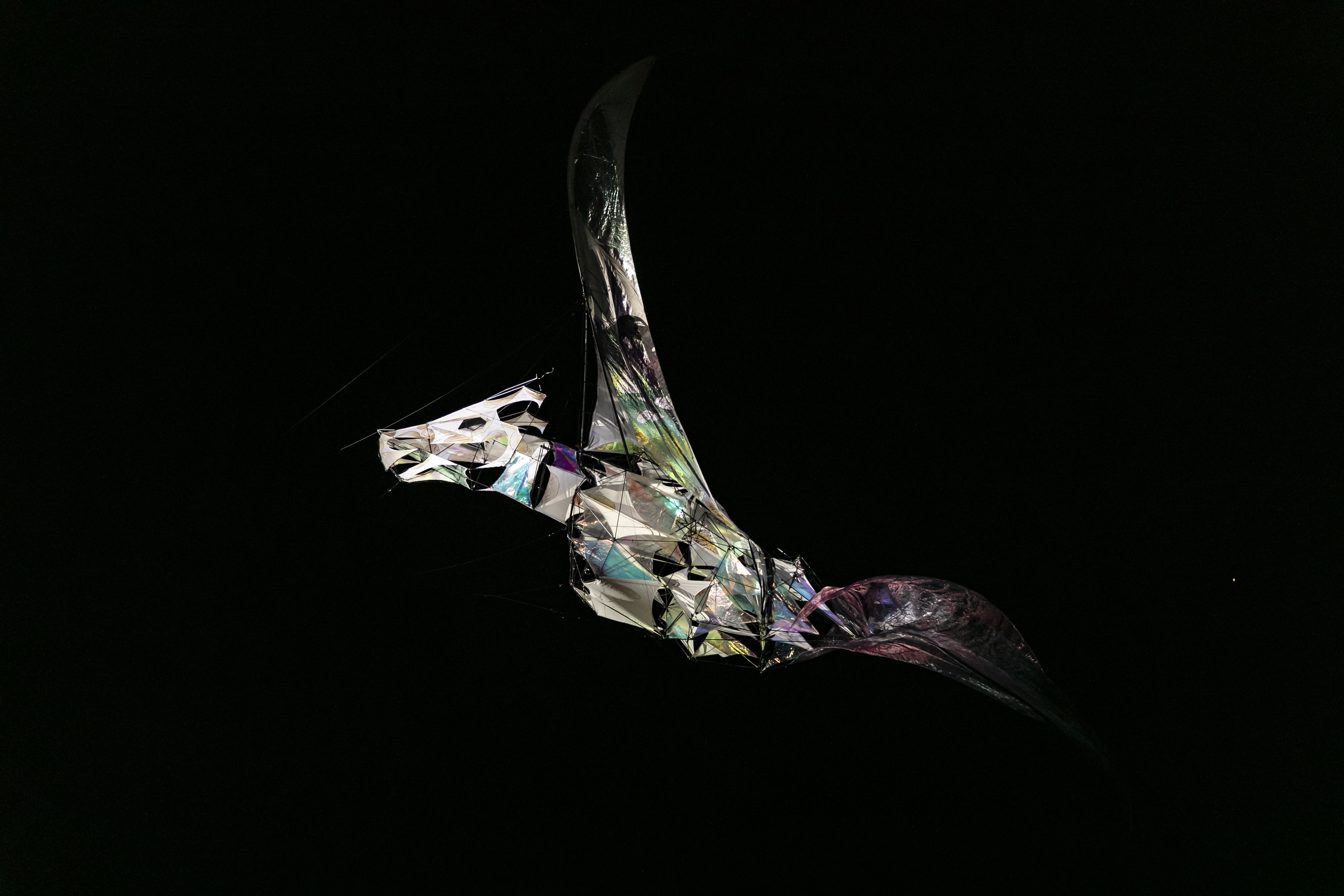
The Hatchling in flight, by Damian Pudner, 2021

=== Design and production ===
According to Angie Bual, artistic director of Trigger, the original purpose of The Hatchling project was as follows:

The project is a celebration of cultural diversity, openness and unity, asking us to celebrate our commonalities over our differences, and it is a real opportunity to confront issues around migration and freedom of movement through the global symbol of the dragon. Whilst found in stories in every ancient culture around the world, the dragon is revered and respected in eastern mythology but often considered menacing in western folklore. The power public art has to unify us has never been more important.

The event and puppet were designed "in partnership with a palaeontologist", by a production team from Trigger Productions Limited of Bristol, "in collaboration with a leading design team specialising in puppetry, kites and immersive theatre". The event was funded by Arts Council England and Plymouth City Council. The idea was conceived by Angie Bual, artistic director of Trigger, and was "brought to life in collaboration with a team of leading creatives including Mervyn Millar, part of the original creative team of the... stage production War Horse, and Carl Robertshaw, a designer who has created sets for the London 2012 Olympic Ceremonies... and is a five-time sport kite world champion". The Plymouth a cappella group, The Lost Sound, provided music for the moments when the puppet slept and flew.

== The Queen's Platinum Jubilee ==
On 5 June 2022:

[The] Hatchling dragon puppet led an array of cultural celebrations outside Buckingham Palace at the Platinum Jubilee Pageant ... bringing central London to life with colour, street theatre and dance. As she curiously and playfully explored The Mall, the Hatchling was greeted by a friend. A single dancer ... Intricate kites and long, flowing ribbons unfurled at the dragon’s wings, adding a sense of flight, excitement and celebration. Their activity heralded the arrival of the pageant parade which guided towards the palace.

As described by The Guardian in 2021:

A giant dragon puppet will be the centrepiece of the platinum jubilee pageant as the story of Queen Elizabeth II’s 70-year reign is told through street theatre, dance, circus acts and marching bands during a central London spectacular.

The Hatchling dragon puppet led an array of cultural celebrations outside Buckingham Palace at the Platinum Jubilee Pageant on Sunday 5 June 2022, bringing central London to life with colour, street theatre and dance. After processing down The Mall, The Hatchling encountered Singaporean dancer Janice Ho. The dance performed by Ho, in which she played the Queen, symbolised the responsibility of the throne. This symbolic moment was described thus via live BBC news coverage:

It’s a wonderful analogy isn’t it - this young princess, a young Princess Elizabeth who came to the throne when she was 25 years old. A young Queen and that sense of power and in this beautiful dragon you’re getting that sense of magnitude, the enormity of what she was taking on as a young woman who wasn’t born to do this role and who is the longest reigning monarch.

The single dancer and The Hatchling heralded the arrival of the pageant parade which they guided towards the palace. The procession led by The Hatchling included 5,000 street performers. The Queen's Platinum Jubilee Pageant featured some of the original puppetry cast, from The Hatchling's Plymouth premiere, alongside numerous other performers and kiters. A 26 April 2022 Press release said that the procession was now named The People's Pageant, and that the Hatchling would open the Act III: Let's Celebrate section of the procession. The other acts were as follows: Act I was a military set, Act II was a historical set featuring vehicles, and Act IV was a finale performance.

== Puppet ==
=== Construction and puppeteering ===
The Hatchling was designed by Carl Robertshaw, in the general shape of a pterosaur, although the finished adult puppet is a little larger than the prehistoric creature. The Times said that The Hatchling was "the largest ever to be powered by people". The puppet is a kite construction with a wingspan of more than 20 metres (65.6 feet). In 2021 it was "the world’s largest human-operated puppet to attempt flight".

The Hatchling, which stands at over 6.5 metres (21.3 feet). tall, is the largest ever puppet to be solely human-operated. It is constructed from super lightweight carbon fibre weighing less than a piece of hand luggage, allowing it to be operated by a team of 36 puppeteers working in rotation in groups of 15.

A team from Plymouth College of Art constructed the egg, using 33 metres (108.3 feet) of lycra.

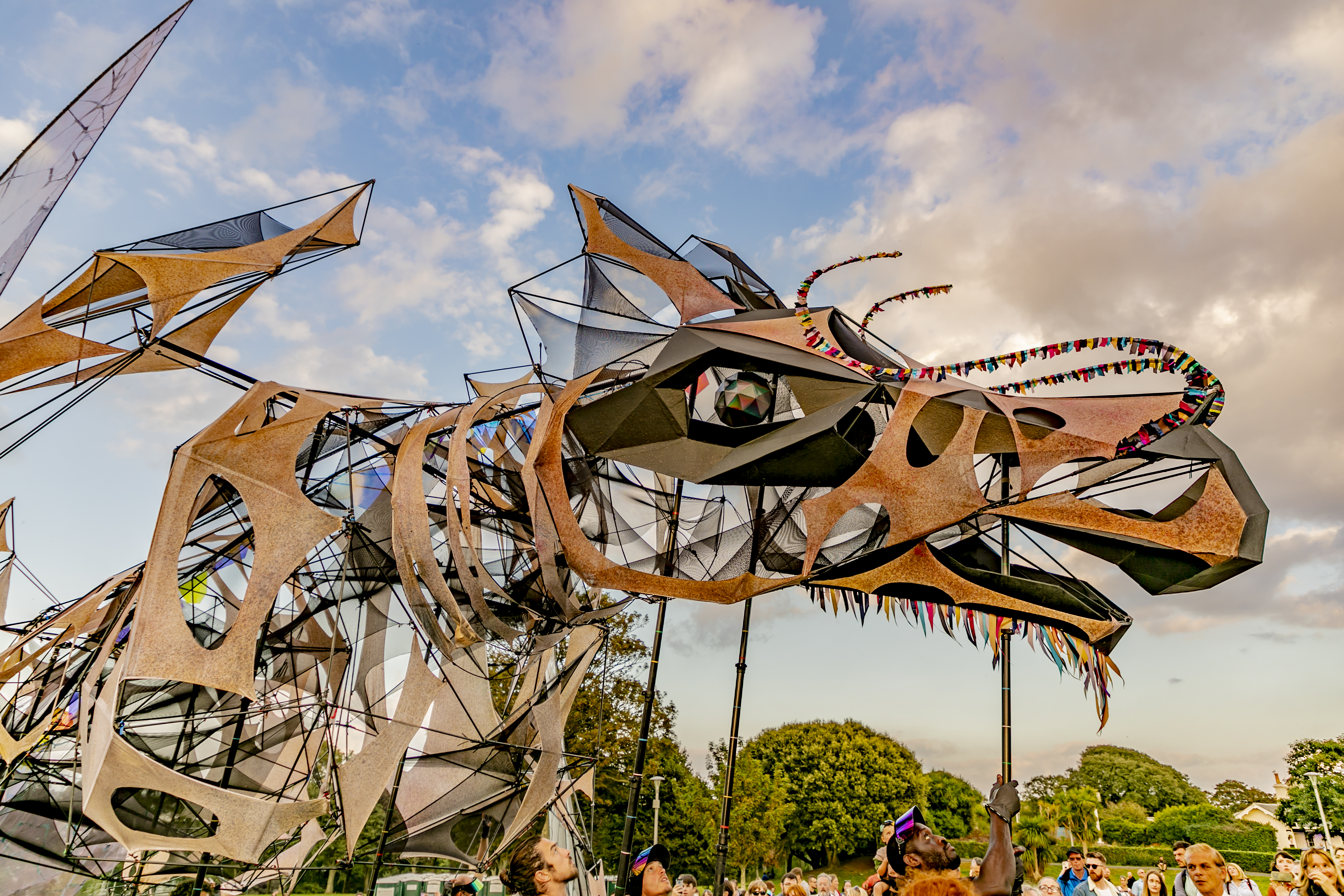
The Hatchling as a rod puppet, in procession, by Damian Pudner 2021

== Reviews ==
- "Something truly out of this world". (BBC News).
- "This is a truly unique art show". (Closer).
- "It was an amazing sight to watch tens of thousands of people on Plymouth Hoe witness The Hatchling transform in front of their eyes to rise and fly out across Plymouth Sound in pursuit of the pearl". Nick Kelly, leader of Plymouth City Council on (BBC News).
- "The star of the show will be a giant puppet dragon the size of a double decker bus, with a wingspan the width of The Mall" (The Times).

== Future events ==
The Hatchling is currently available for touring.

== See also ==
- Giant puppet
