= Little Amal =

Giant puppet used in 2021 in The Walk

Little Amal, The Walk
- Walk With Amal logo

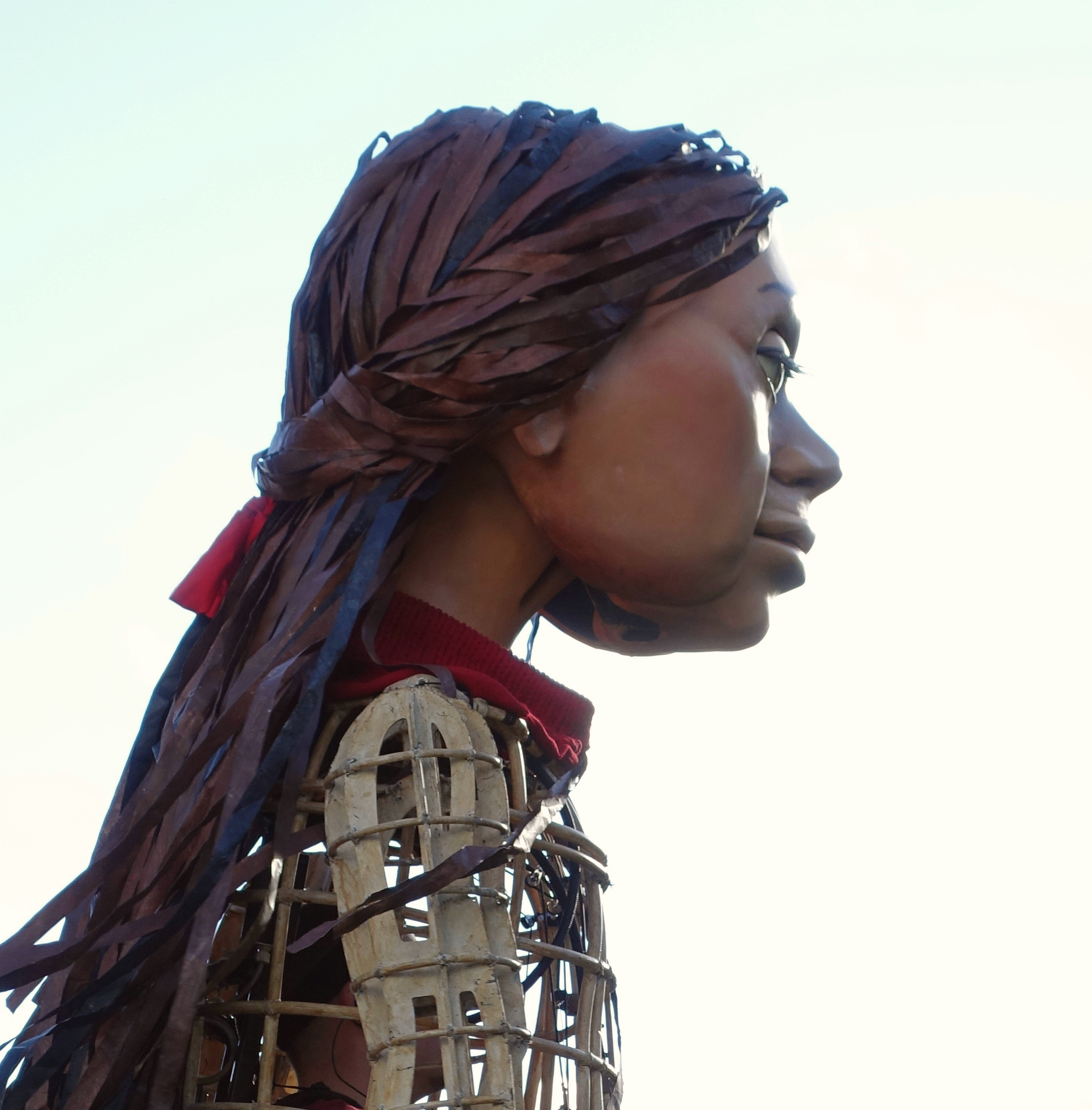
- Little Amal at Barnsley, 2021
- Date: July 18 – November 3, 2021
- Location: 8,000 km (5,000 mi) tour from the Syria-Turkey border via Turkey, Greece, Italy, France, Switzerland, Germany, and Belgium, to the United Kingdom
- Type: Performance art
- Theme: Human migration
- Motive: "Celebration of migration and cultural diversity"
- Organised by: The Walk Productions, Good Chance and Handspring Puppet Company
- Website: www.walkwithamal.org

Little Amal is a 3.5-metre (11 ft) manually operated, partly-animatronic giant puppet and is the centrepiece of the performance art project called The Walk. The project was created by the British production companies The Walk Productions and Good Chance in collaboration with the South African Handspring Puppet Company. With the intention of celebrating human migration and cultural diversity, the puppet initially journeyed for five months from the Syria-Turkey border via Europe to the United Kingdom, and walked and took part in locally arranged events in 65 towns and cities along the way. Little Amal was greeted at some venues by local dignitaries, such as Pope Francis, Vincent Nichols Archbishop of Westminster and Cllr Caroline Makinson, Mayor of Barnsley.

The puppet's Little Amal persona originated as a character in The Jungle, a play created in the former Calais jungle encampment in 2015. The name Amal means "hope" in Arabic. Little Amal represents a nine-year-old Syrian refugee girl who, in The Walk project, travels alone across Europe to find her mother. "Dozens" of designers and craftspeople combined to create the puppet, which is controlled by at least three puppeteers: two to move the hands, and one interior puppeteer who walks on heavily weighted stilts, and controls the head, eyes and mouth by hand via a mechanism called the harp.

In some areas, Little Amal's reception was mixed, with some racist or even violent responses, but in most towns there was no problem. On the South Bank in London, she walked side by side with Handspring's Joey the War Horse.

== The Walk ==
The Walk is a "travelling art festival ... a celebration of migration and cultural diversity", organised by the British production companies The Walk Productions and Good Chance in collaboration with the South African Handspring Puppet Company. The artistic director was Amir Nizar Zuabi, and the producers were Stephen Daldry, David Lan, Tracey Seaward and Naomi Webb. The project involved "celebrated artists, major cultural institutions, community groups and humanitarian organisations". The event consisted primarily of a puppet representing a displaced refugee child who was fleeing from war and separated from her family, walking across Europe to find her mother, and wishing to attend school: "The puppet represent[ed] displaced children, who [had] been separated from their families, and by travelling over 8,000 kilometres (5,000 miles) they hope[d] that Little Amal [would] share the urgent message from all young refugees Don't forget about us".

The founders of Handspring Puppet Company, Basil Jones and Adrian Kohler, have said, "The story of refugees is so important for the whole world. Many countries are on the move because of conflict, climate change, farmers that can't work anymore through lack of rain. It's the big story of our time. Because it's an outdoor event, The Walk has the potential of bringing people together again. At a moment when theatres are struggling to re-open this is something everyone can be a part of". Project director Amir Nizar Zuabi said, "The purpose of The Walk is to highlight the potential of the refugee, not just their dire circumstances".

== 2021 itinerary ==
Note: The dates below cover not only the dates of Little Amal's passage via 65 towns and cities across Europe and the UK, but also those of other events organised in connection with The Walk project.

- Turkey 27 July – 8 August. In Gaziantep, Little Amal followed a path of lanterns to a dance with live music and a suitcase of gifts for the journey. In Çeşme, she followed a path of shoes to the sea, where many refugees had lost their lives.
- Greece, 9 August – 5 September. In Chios there were songs in Little Amal's honour, and in Ioannina, light boxes illuminated words of encouragement. At Katsikas refugee camp, Amal was greeted by refugee children.
- Italy, 7 – 19 September. In Sanremo there were artistic installations and musical events. In Bari, Amal was met by a nonna, or grandmother-figure, who imparted words of wisdom. In Rome she was greeted by Pope Francis, who took her hand.
- France, 21 September – 17 October. In Marseille an epic dance, titled When the Waves Have Come and Gone, took place.
- Switzerland, 28–29 September. Little Amal was photographed outside the United Nations building in Geneva, and visited CERN.
- Germany 1 – 4 October. In Stuttgart Little Amal was entertained by the 5-metre-tall puppets of Dundu. (Note: Here is an example of Dundu puppets: File:DUNDU-Santiago-A-Mil-Luz-de-Vida-Sharing-the-Light.jpg)
- Belgium, 6–10 October. Here, Little Amal handed over "a mountain of letters to the European Parliament in the Belgian capital, all drawing attention to the difficulties experienced by uprooted refugee children". She visited Antwerp, where she met the Reuskens van Borgerhout (little giants of Borgerhout), Brussels and Bouillon.
- United Kingdom, 18 July – 3 November.

- UK venues included: Folkestone 19 October, where Little Amal was greeted by Jude Law who held her hand, Dover 20 October, and Canterbury 21 October where a Refugee Tales project was hosted by Niamh Cusack, and Little Amal walked in procession from Canterbury Cathedral to the University of Kent campus.
- Little Amal visited London between 22 and 24 October. On the South Bank Little Amal was greeted by Joey the War Horse puppet, which accompanied her on the South Bank walk. London venues included: Lewisham and Royal Docks 22 October, St Paul's Cathedral, Globe Theatre, Southbank Centre, Royal National Theatre, Somerset House 23 October, Victoria & Albert Museum where Little Amal celebrated her 10th birthday, Trafalgar Square, Roundhouse 24 October, and Westminster Cathedral 25 October, where Little Amal was greeted and given a blessing by Vincent Nichols, Archbishop of Westminster.
- The other UK venues were: Oxford 26 October, where she was greeted by a similarly sized puppet of Alice, Coventry 27 October, Birmingham 28 October, Sheffield 29 October, Barnsley 30 October, Rochdale 2 November, Wigan 2 November, and Manchester 3 November, where she was welcomed at Old Trafford.

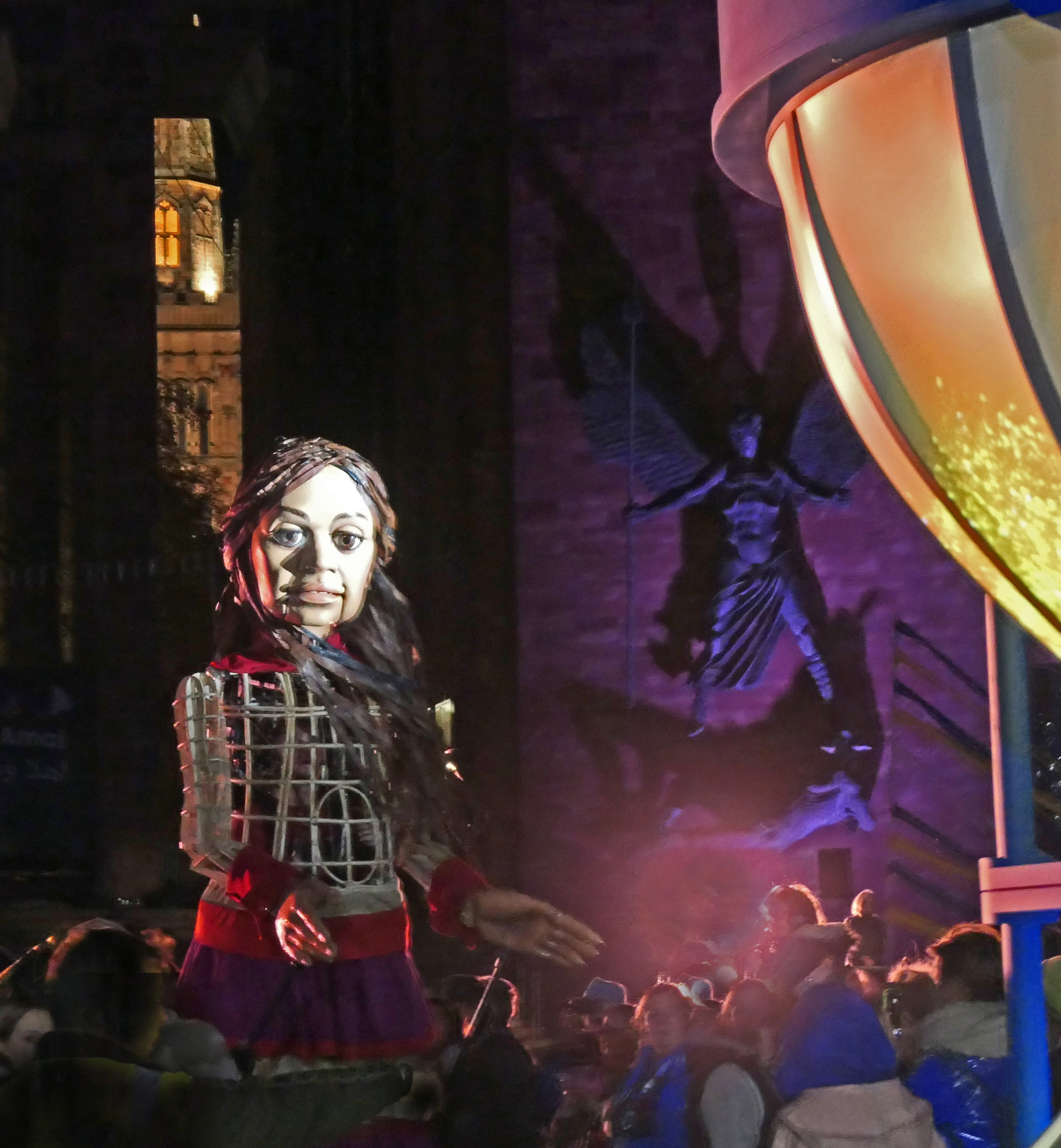
Little Amal at Coventry Cathedral

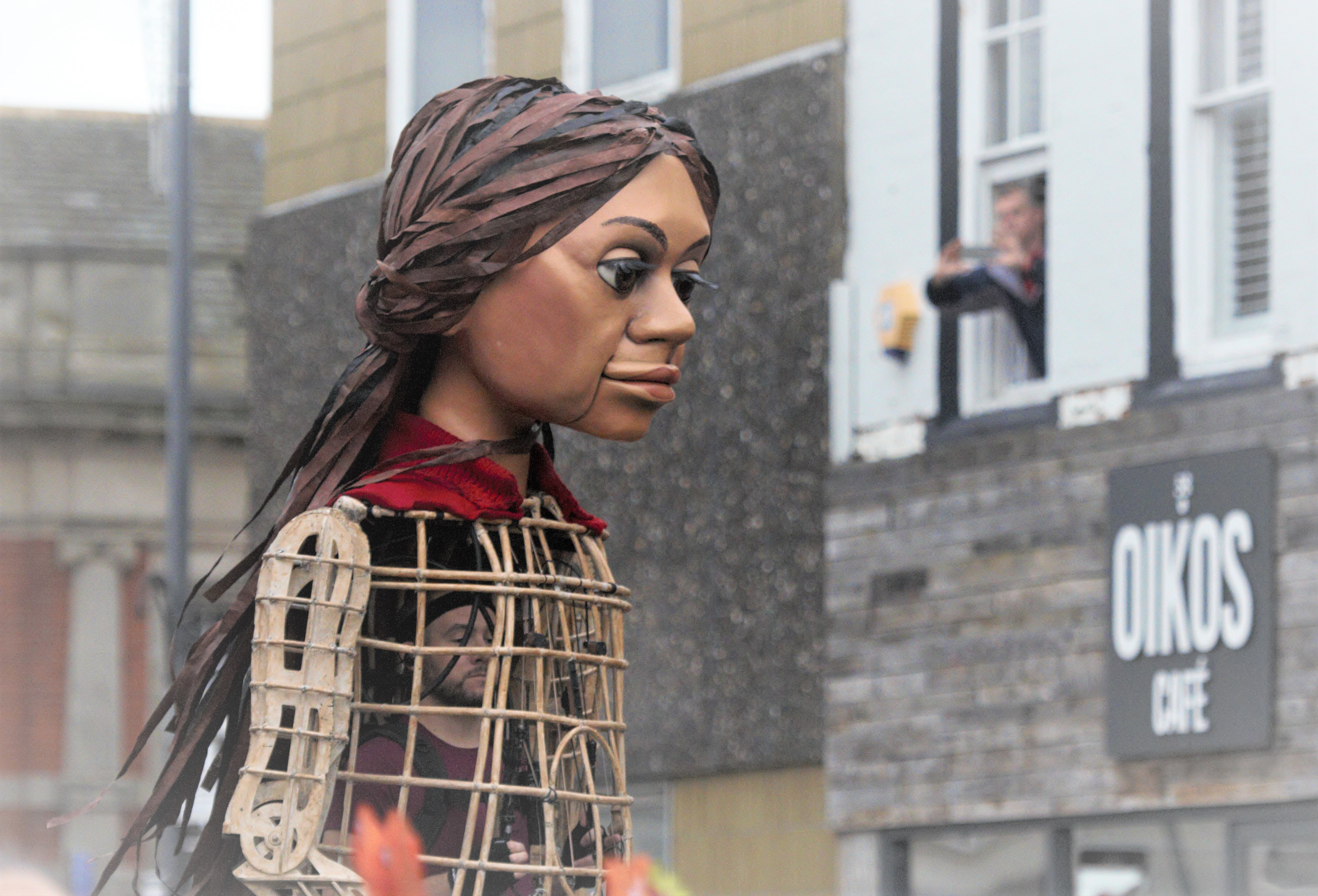
Little Amal in Birmingham

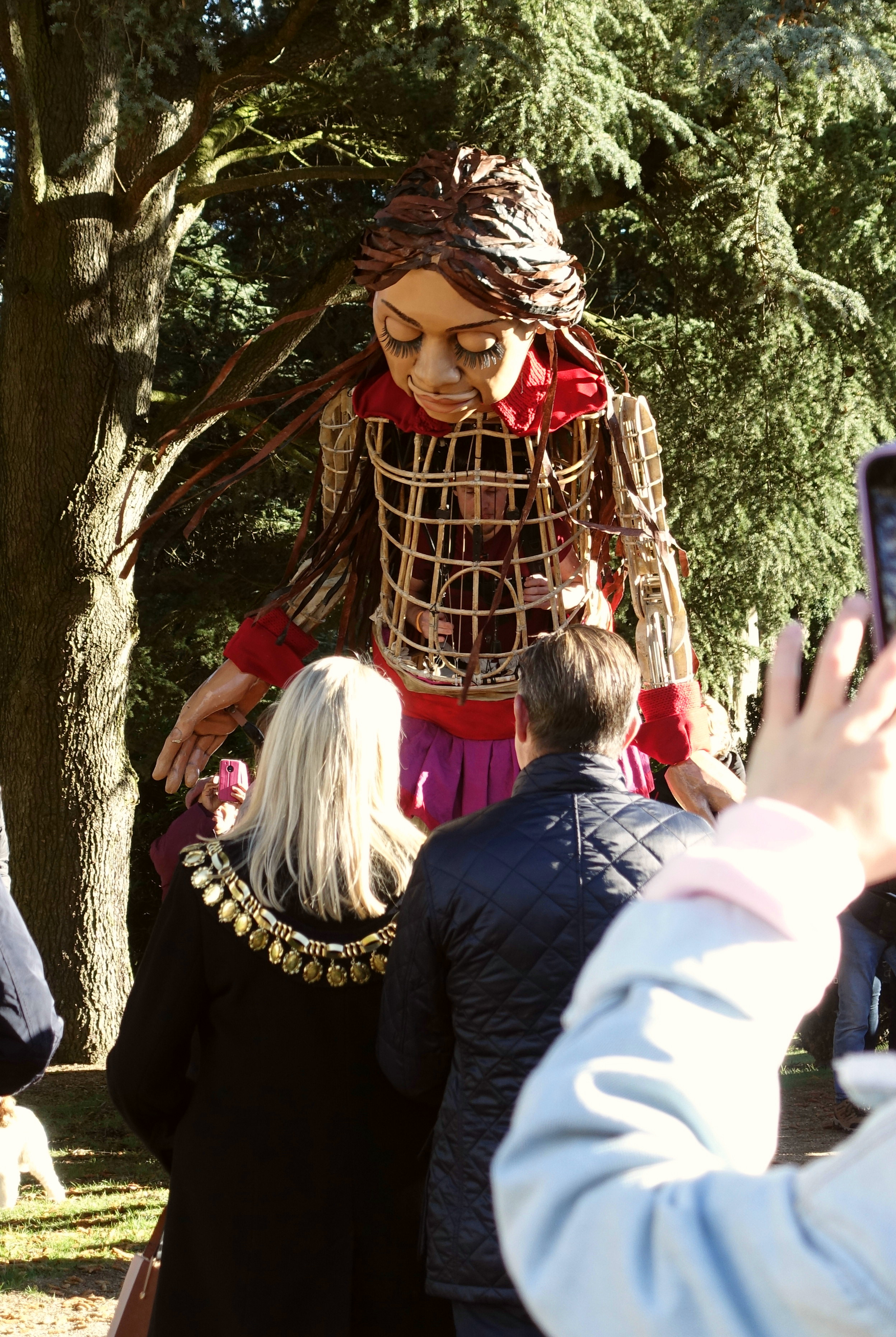
The Mayor of Barnsley greeting Little Amal, in Barnsley

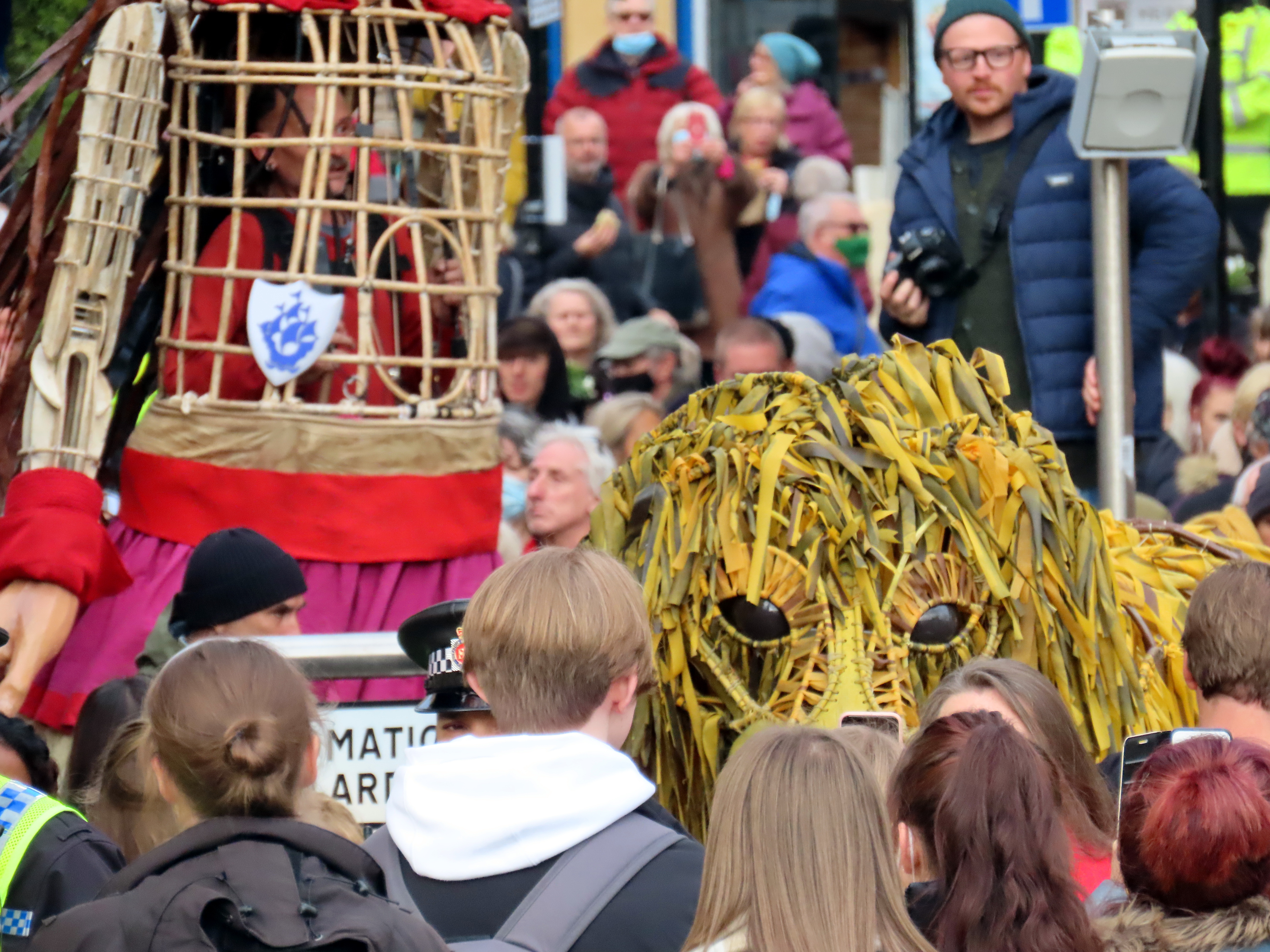
Little Amal with Anbesa the lion in Rochdale

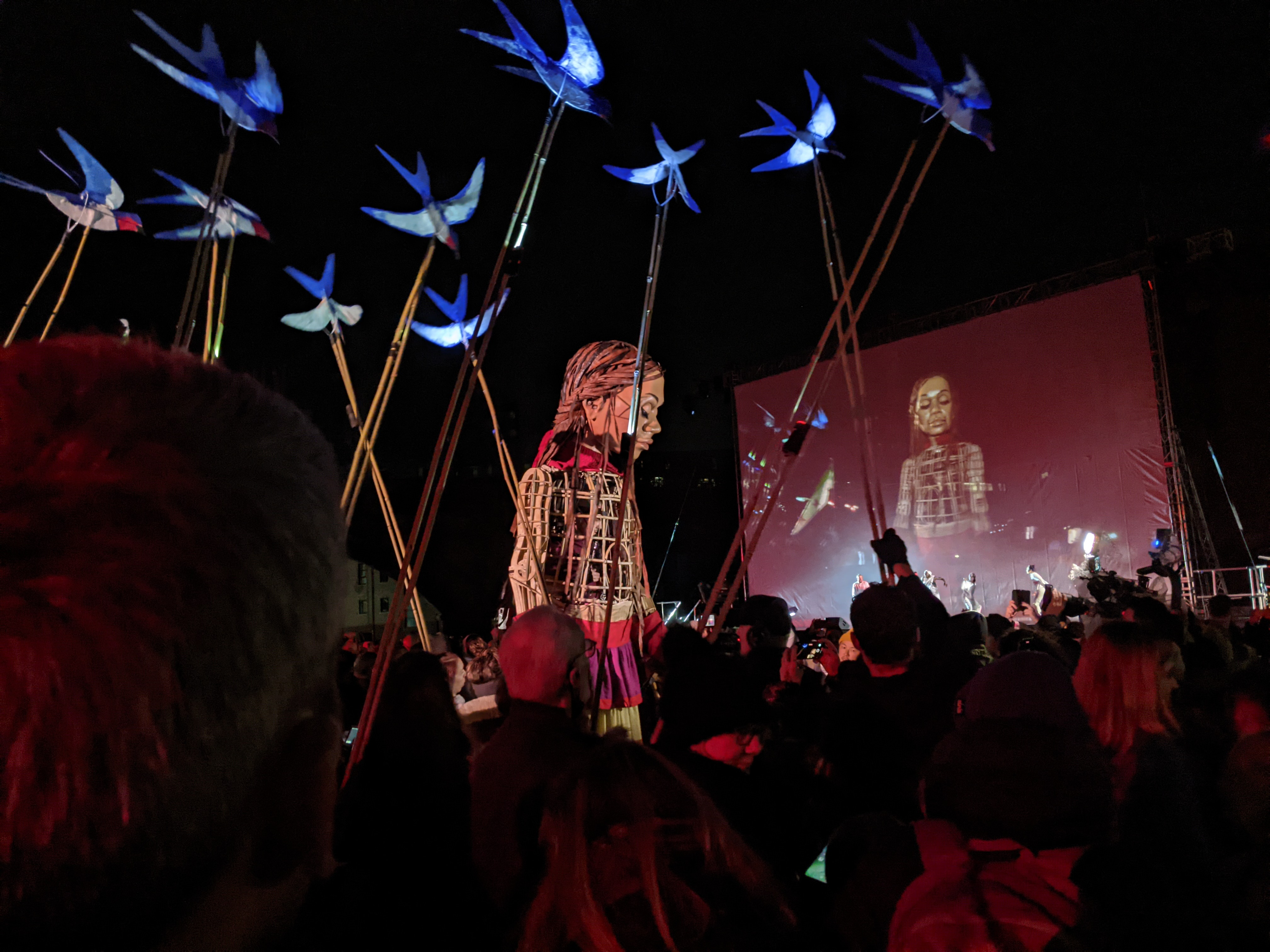
Little Amal among puppet birds in Castlefield Bowl, Manchester.

== 2022 itinerary ==
- Ukraine and Poland, 10 –14 May. Little Amal visited Lviv, Ukraine, where she met displaced children and families fleeing the war. She then went to Poland, where she visited Lublin, Kraków, and Przemyśl, which is near the border to Ukraine.
- United Kingdom 19 – 27 June 2022. In 2022, Amal revisited the UK for World Refugee Week. She visited Manchester, Bradford, Leeds, Liverpool, Bristol, Stonehenge, London, Canterbury, and Folkestone.
- New York, USA, 14 September – 2 October. In NYC, Amal visited all five boroughs, where she attended 55 events during the 17 days she was in NYC. She came to NYC to find her uncle Samir.
  - Queens: Little Amal arrived at JFK International Airport on September 14, where she was welcomed by the Metropolitan Opera Orchestra and children's chorus. Amal returned to Queens on September 21 for three events. Starting at Corona Queens with an event called “In the garden of hope,” where she danced with the indigenous dance group Cetiliztli Nauchcamp at the community garden. Then she went to Flushing Meadows, Corona Park, where she met an unexpected friend, and that event was called “When I find an unexpected friend.” Amal went to Jackson Heights in an event called “Beating heart” where the drumming echoed her heartbeat, because she was afraid. Some of the other events she attended in Queens were: "All alone in the dark" in Astoria, and "Lost in Jamaica, Queens."
  - Bronx: In the Bronx, Amal attended three events. On September 25, she and the Mott Haven community searched for the waterfront so that they could breathe some fresh air. The event was titled “In search of the waterfront.” On the same day, Amal participated in hip hop at the “Streets of Hip Hop, streets of home” event. In the event “A really, really high bridge,” the community helped Amal cross the High Bridge, which frightened her.
  - Brooklyn: In Brooklyn Amal attended eleven events: “When Coney Island is closed,” “Listen to my story,” “Listen and you will hear,” “Nowhere to sleep,” “Connections” “Bed Stuy is buzzing” “A quiet refuge” “Almost like home,” “Time to fly,” “When the pigeons flock,” and “All the friends I have made.” “All the friends I have made” took place on Amal's last day in NYC near St. Ann's Warehouse, the partnership that brought her to NYC.
  - Manhattan: In Manhattan, Amal attended twenty events. Some of those were: "When everyone knows where they are going", "A dream we hold in our hands", "Flashing Lights", "When afraid hum a song", "Dazzled, A place to play", "When you find your rhythm", "A big building full of wonders", "A moment to rest, Amal… Park… Cake!", "I felt really lonely and just had to dance", "When the world sounds like a prayer", "Embrace the tangle", "Fiesta at The Clemente", "Kindness is a journey".
  - Staten Island: In Snug Harbor Cultural Center & Botanical Garden, Amal attended “Little butterfly, don’t be afraid.” She was welcomed there with craft and a parade.
- Amsterdam, 9 – 10 October 2022: Little Amal was invited to Amsterdam by Bloomberg CityLab. She walked from Dam Square and passed by Anne Frank House, where the general director of Anne Frank House received Amal Anne's diary in Arabic.

== Puppet ==
The puppet Little Amal was created by Handspring Puppet Company, which built the puppets for the 2007 play War Horse. The Little Amal character first appeared in The Jungle, an award-winning 2015 play created by Good Chance in the Theatre of Hope dome in the former Calais Jungle, which was an unofficial refugee camp outside Calais.

There are three identical Little Amal puppets, created to allow simultaneous events at different locations. They were constructed for the 2021 passage and carried between venues. They were presented as one puppet and were not seen together. Separately, they performed short walks in each location, taking part in events arranged locally. The puppet design represents a nine-year-old Syrian female refugee named Little Amal, amal being Arabic for "hope".

=== Construction and puppeteering ===
The puppet, Little Amal, is 3.5 m (11 ft) tall, and is constructed of cane, carbon fibre, and other light materials. Three or four puppeteers control the puppet. Two control the arms via poles attached to the hands, one optional puppeteer supports the back, and the interior puppeteer stands on stilts within the legs, controlling body movements. The interior puppeteer also controls facial expression via equipment called "the harp". The puppet's eyes are controlled by a small computer; thus she is partly animatronic. Some of the puppeteers controlling the arms in 2021 were former refugees who were hired in Calais. "Dozens" of designers and craftspeople combined to create the three puppets which represent Little Amal. Ten pairs of stilt-legs were created, to fit ten different puppeteers.

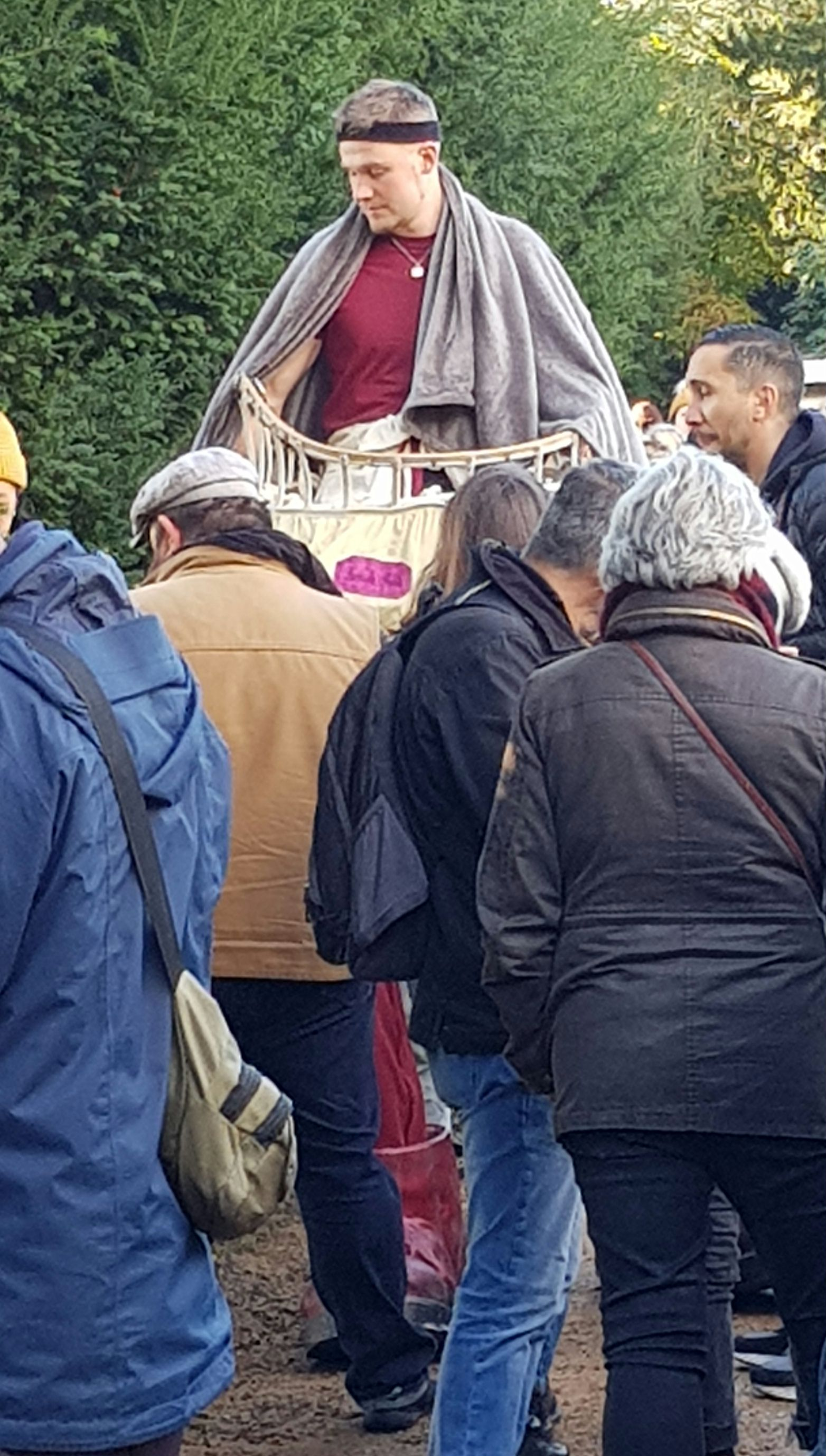
The interior puppeteer, installed on the stilt legs

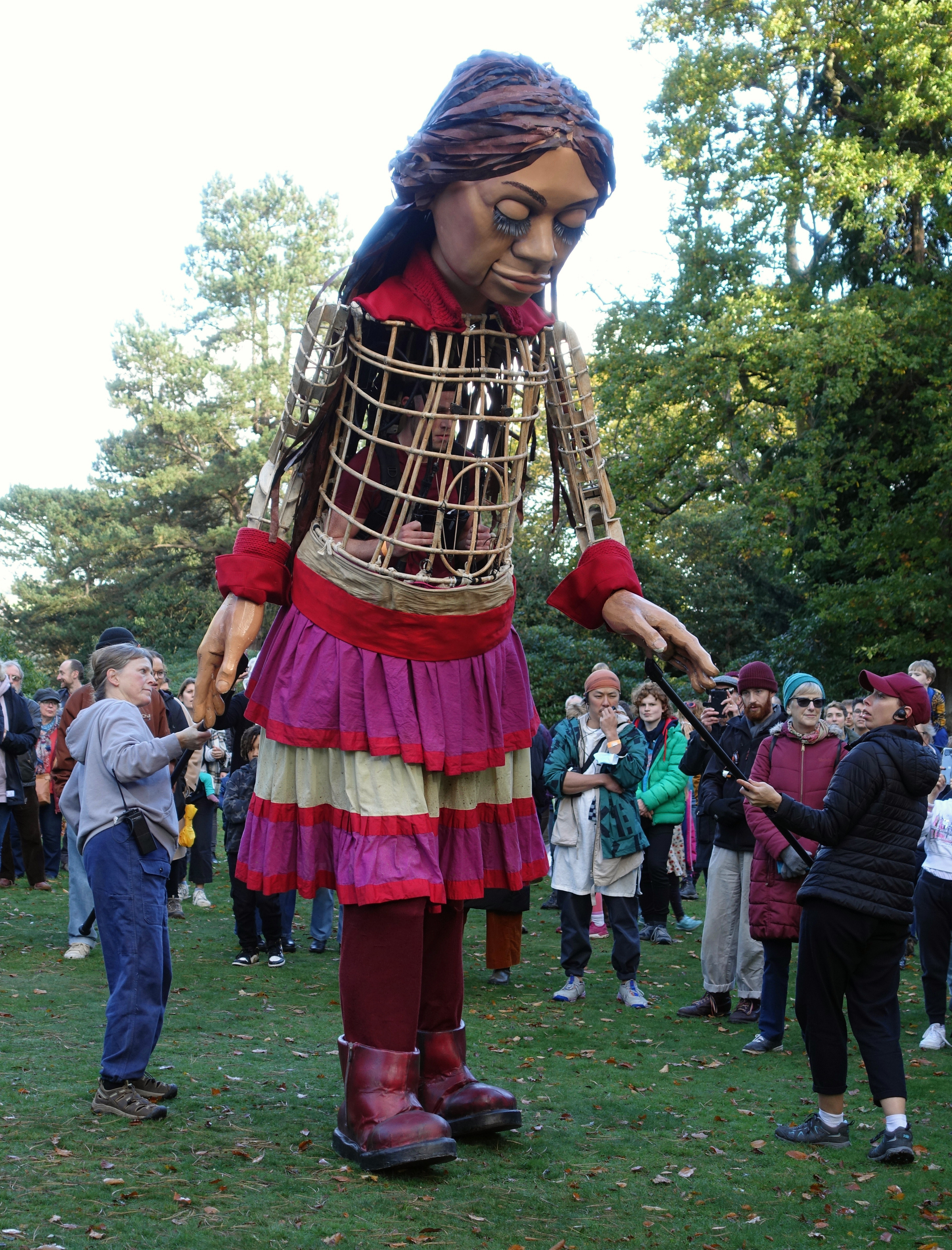
Puppet with three visible puppeteers

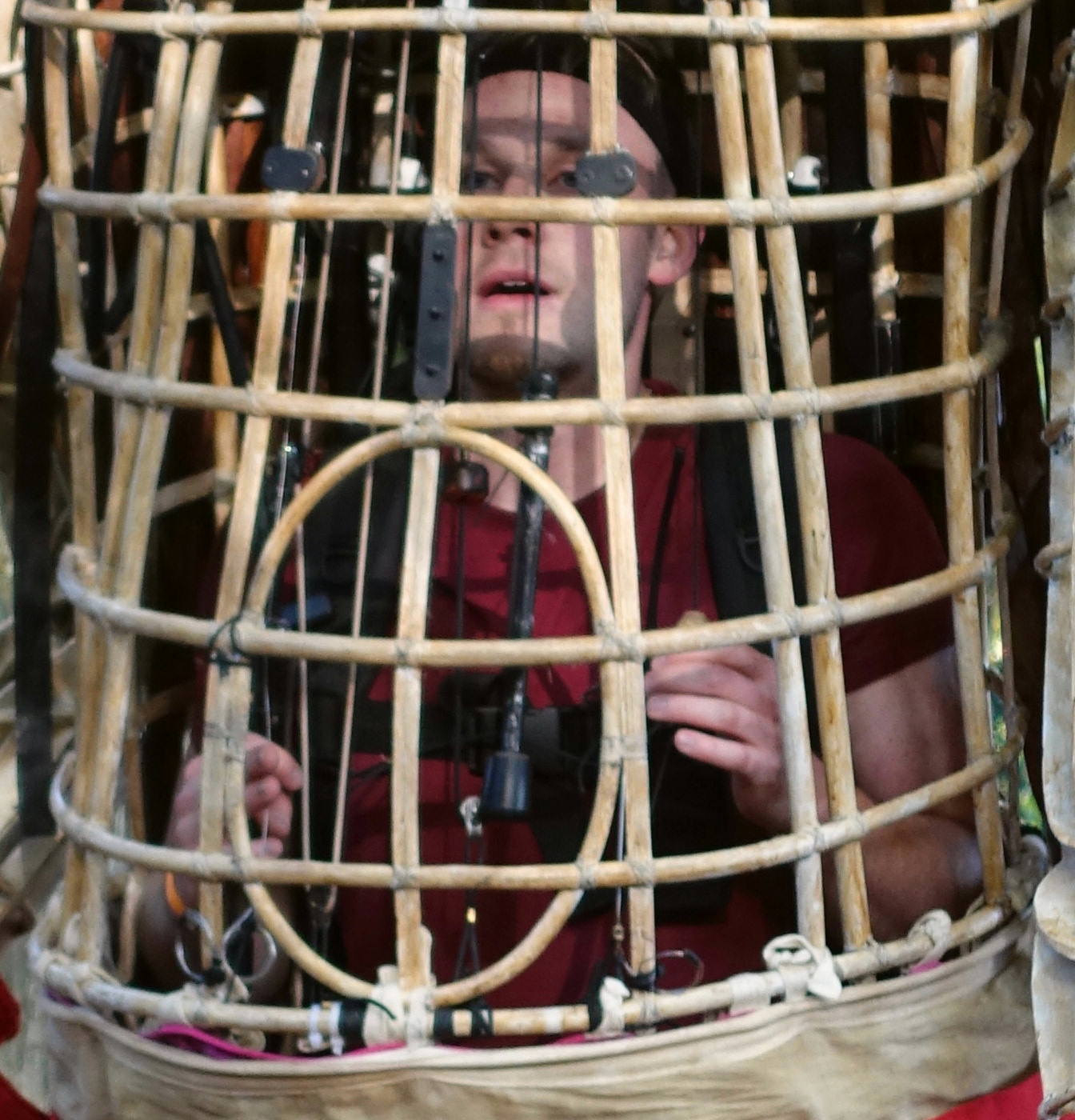
Interior puppeteer

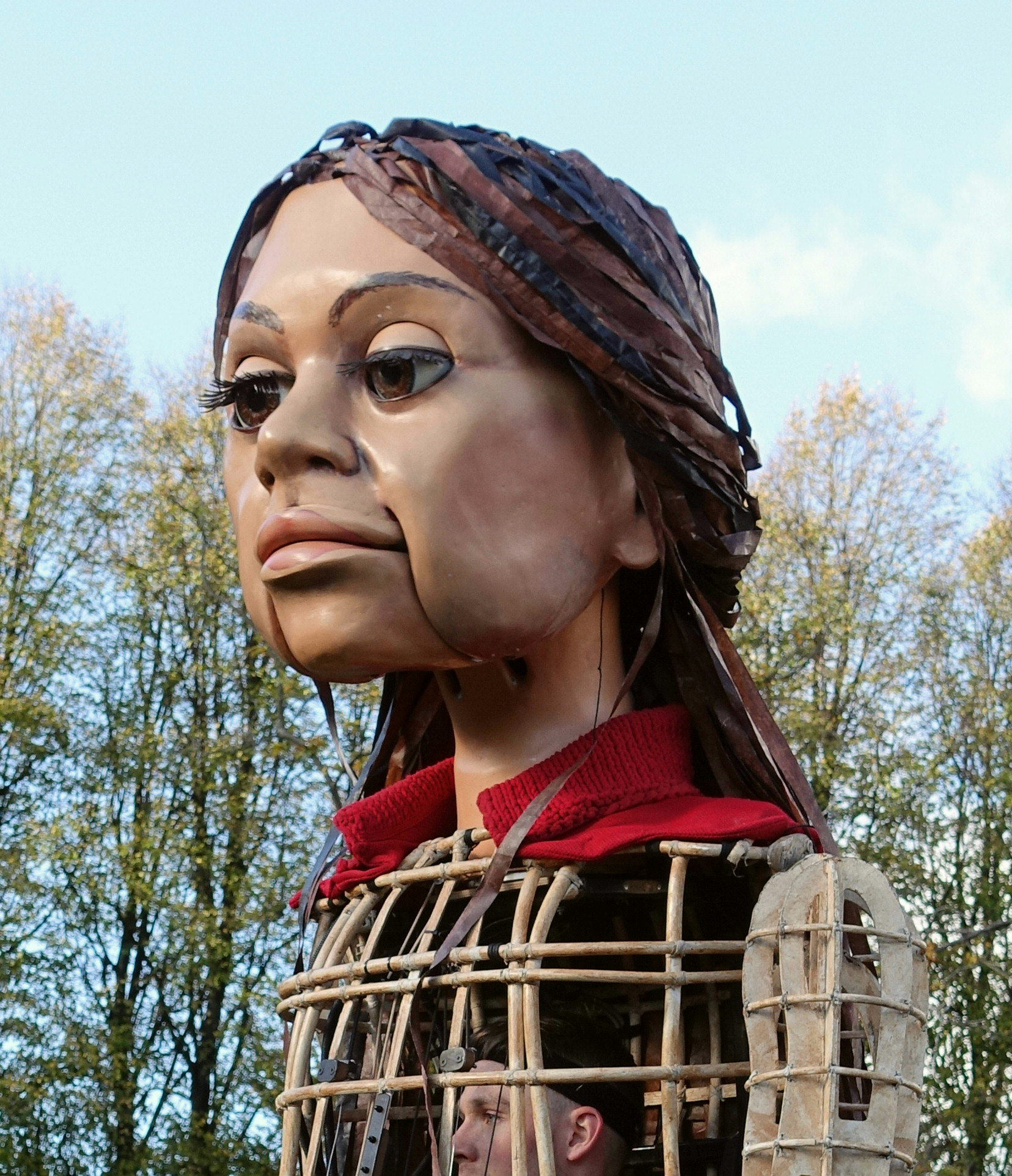
The puppet's face

== Response ==
=== Emotional response to the puppet ===
There has been a human emotional response to this animatronic puppet. After welcoming Little Amal in Westminster Cathedral, the Cardinal of Westminster Vincent Nichols said, "Well, it's very strange, actually. Half of me says, come on, this is a puppet. And half of me found myself speaking to her. So there's something very creative in what we saw this afternoon. It wasn't just a puppet – though it was – but it kind of embodies a whole dimension of our human family that is travelling lost, at risk and in danger. And yet still with the kind of innocence that you would expect of a young child. So I think there was a strong emotional presence and a pull that somehow, in her gestures particularly, was expressed. I think that touched everybody".

=== Political response to The Walk ===
The Guardian said, "From being pelted with stones in Greece to receiving a papal welcome in Rome, the giant girl's migrant trek from Syria to Manchester provoked powerful responses". Producer David Lan said, "If I was to say to you we had nothing but warmth and support along the journey, it would not be true ... but what Little Amal seems to do is take the experience of people who are quite brutally marginalised and put it in the centre. This is about goodwill. It is an opportunity for people to be sympathetic and imagine what it would be like to be her." Meanwhile, in Greece the local councillors did not allow the Little Amal puppet, as a representation of a Muslim child, to visit the Greek Orthodox monasteries of Meteora – however the people of a nearby town showed support. In Larissa, right-wing protestors threw stones at Little Amal, hitting also some of the 300 children who had made and brought their own puppets to The Walk. On the other hand, artistic director Zuabi said, "The positives have outweighed the negatives ... We have seen a lot of generosity. We're doing this project to celebrate our shared humanity ... People are flocking to see her".

== Little Amal in different locations ==
=== Amal In NYC ===
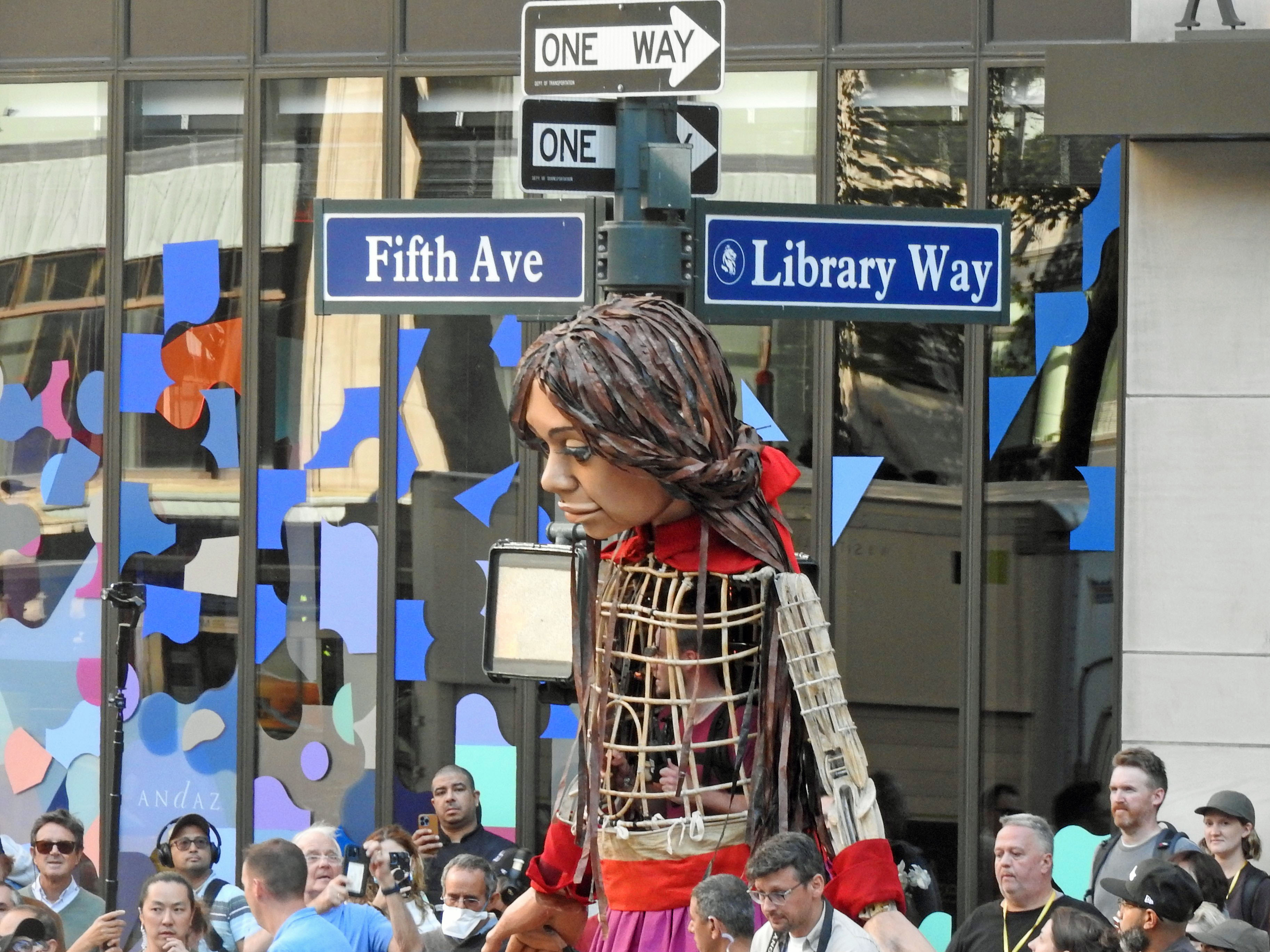
Amal at NYPL

Little Amal arrived at JFK airport on September 14, 2022, where she was welcomed by the Metropolitan Opera Orchestra and children's chorus. Amal stayed in NYC for 17 days and left on October 17, 2022. Instead of visiting tourist attractions, the puppet Little Amal experienced the "real" New York by going to places in the city that are significant to immigrant communities because Little Amal's journey symbolized the desire to build a better life for oneself, family, and neighbors. Little Amal attended different events across the five boroughs, where she interacted with the communities, the children, and the performers by participating in dances and music. Each event had a different mission. For example, in the Bronx, Little Amal wanted to cross the High Bridge but was afraid of heights, so the community helped her get over her fear. In Bay Ridge, she was caught in a Syrian wedding where the music reminded her of back home.

Claudia Orenstein, a theatre professor at Hunter College and The Graduate Center, City University of New York, who writes about contemporary and traditional puppetry in the US and Asia wrote that Amal was well received in NYC because NYC is a "global political, economic, artistic, and immigrant capital." Amal's visit to NYC raised city-wide awareness, reaching an audience beyond the creative and academic circles of NYC, most New Yorkers at the very least were aware of Little Amal and were discussing and learning about Amal and her mission. Few days after Little Amal left NYC, she became a topic of discussion at the Pageant Puppets Panel at Puppet Homecoming, Puppeteers of America's Northeast/Mid-Atlantic Regional Festival, which took place in Coney Island. Panelists viewed Amal as fitting into the USA's long history of political processional puppetry.
