= Giant puppet =

Type of large puppet

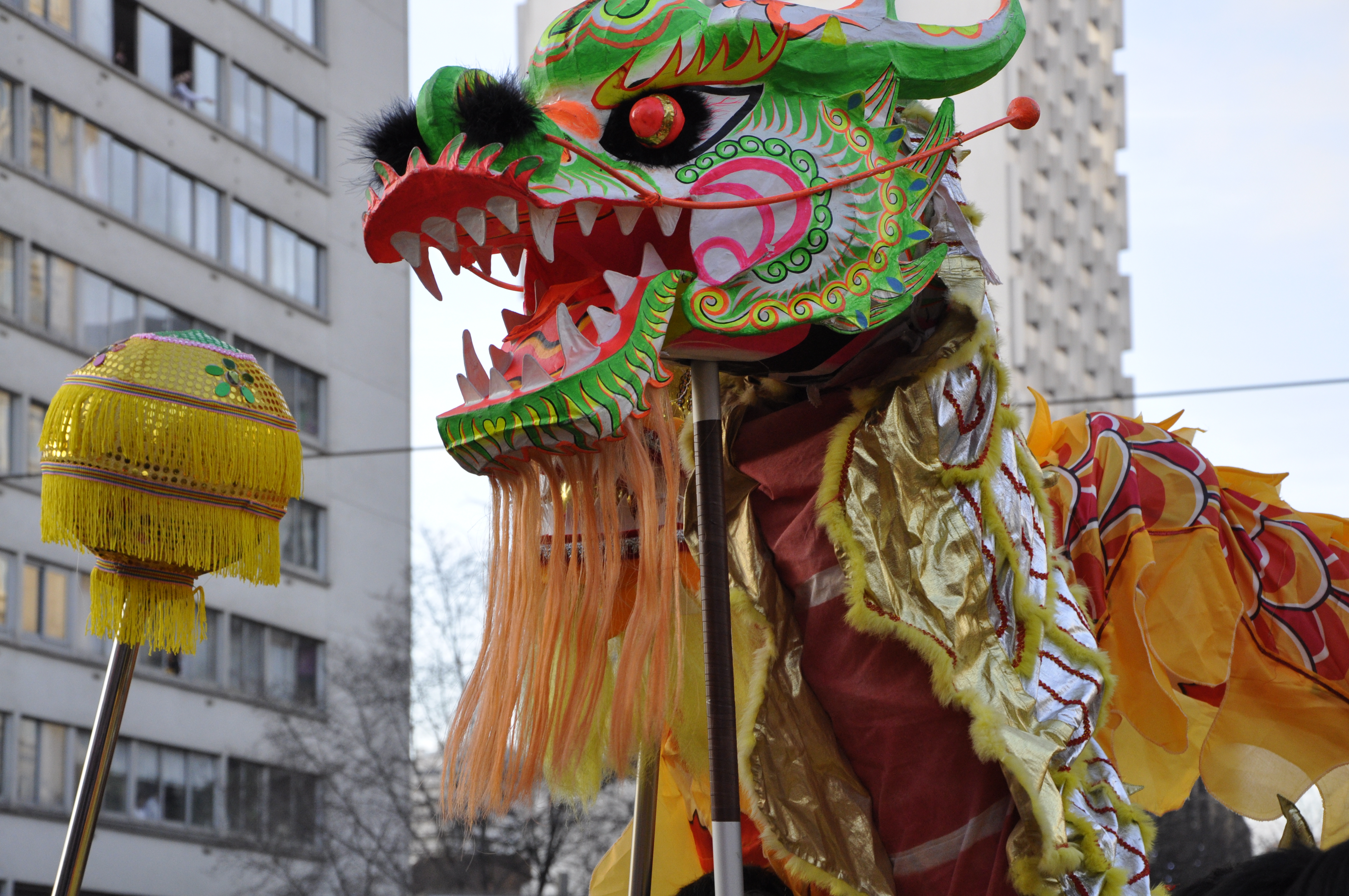
- Chinese dragon performing at New Year celebrations, Paris, 2011
- Material: Lightweight materials such as carbon fibre or bamboo
- Present location: Worldwide

A giant puppet is a puppet which is tall enough to be easily visible to a street crowd while being manipulated by puppeteers, on the same level. It is therefore most suitable for processions, street theatre and performance art, although some large theatrical animations can be used for the same purpose. Giant puppets are usually articulated and made from a lightweight material. Some are manipulated by puppeteers using rods, strings, stilts, other mechanisms, or a combination of these. Giant puppets have been used worldwide for street entertainment, celebrations or other purposes from ancient times, and they continue in use and in development today. Of the traditional giant rod puppets, the Chinese dragon New Year puppet is "perhaps the most recognized form of the parade puppet". Of the most recent examples, Royal de Luxe of France has produced a notable set of giant string puppets.

== History ==
Giant puppets are suited to outdoor performance, especially street theatre and processions, because they are visible above the crowd while remaining on the same level.

=== Ancient origins ===
The origins of certain traditions which use giant puppets may be ancient. In Shimla, Himalayas and other areas of India, the Dussehra festivals of September and October celebrate "the triumph of Good over Evil", and 15-metre puppets are carried in procession and then burned. "The principal demons of the epic Ramayana are represented: Ravana with his ten heads, the symbol of destruction and the forces of Evil, accompanied by his son Meghanada (Indrajit) and brother Kumbhakarna. The puppets are made of a bamboo framework covered in layers of paper. Painted in vivid colours, they are accompanied by fireworks to ensure a most spectacular incineration". In the Beembe of Mouyondzi, Congo-Brazzaville, Republic of the Congo, the "anthropomorphic musical instruments ... reach the height of 1.5 metres and are carved from wood and hollowed to resonate the breaths of those that carry them, their mouth placed over the puppet’s back".

In the Democratic Republic of the Congo (former Zaire) the Bwende people take part in a funeral ceremony that consists of carrying, on a stretcher, an enormous puppet called niombo, an effigy to the dead chief. Stitched in woven fabric ornate with symbols, it is made of wood, raffia and herbs and contains the dried remains of the chief. Its size can be up to 2.5 metres (8.2 feet) both in height and width. The Pende people lift a mbambi puppet, from 6 to 10 metres (19.7 to 32.8 feet) high, deep into the bush, at the end of a masked dance. It is raised by sliding bamboo under the body – which is made up of fabric held together by circular rings of palm branches. The head is that of a bearded mask and the arms, holding fly swatters, are animated using twine attached to their outer-most extremities.

The Chinese giant dragon puppets of the New Year festivals are "perhaps the most recognized form of parade puppet". This type of puppet performs a weaving dance in which up to ten puppeteers control it at speed, with rods. Japan has its own tradition: "huge traditional hinkoko marottes consist of a vertical manipulation rod, on the top of which is a grimacing head, and a horizontal rod that simulates the arms. They are dressed in a long cloth robe".

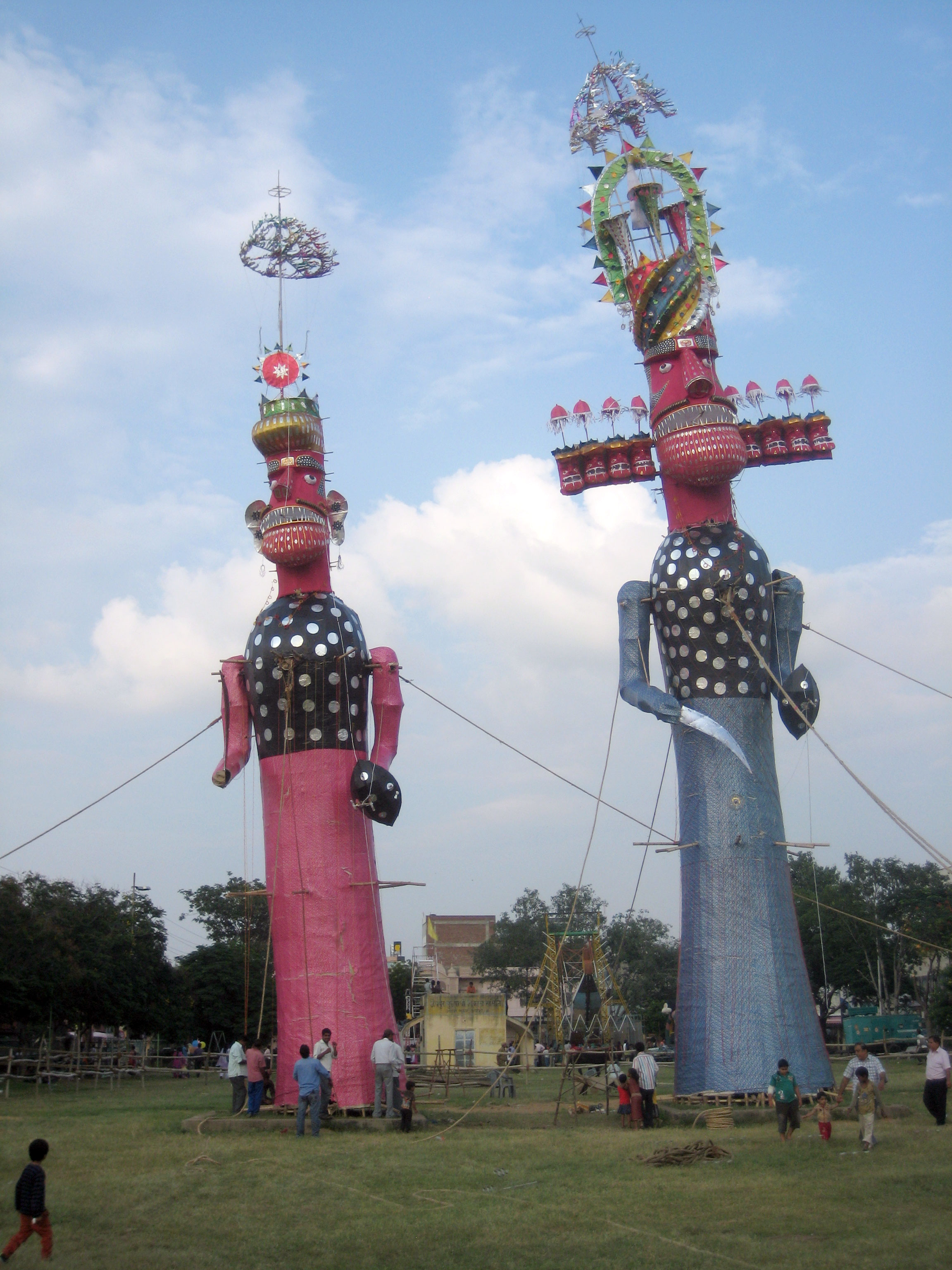
Giant puppets controlled by lines at a Dussehra festival, Jaipur, 2013

=== Medieval developments ===
In 1480, the Giants of Douai tradition began, and it continues in the north of France and in Flanders. "Giant, grotesque figures such as Gayant, Cagenon, Saint Michael and his devil" were used in a festival procession commemorating a French attempt to recapture Douai from the Dutch. After France reclaimed Douai in 1771, the annual procession continued, with the same puppets repurposed, only to be cancelled following the 1789 Revolution and then continued again in 1801.

=== 20th century ===
In New York in 1963 Peter Schumann established the Bread and Puppet Theater, which employs giant puppets and inspired later works by others. By 1967, the company was "protesting against the Vietnam War with rod puppets of impressive size". In Bread and Puppet's 1969 The Cry of the People for Meat, "the nuptial dance of Mother Nature and Uranus was performed by 5-metre-tall rod puppets: the main rod for the head, to which the costume was attached, a rod for each hand and a crew of six manipulators around the puppet itself".

Giant puppets have been used in theatre too. In 1964 Edmund Tamiz directed Don Quichotte at the Récamier theatre, Paris, using giant puppets. In 1970 at the Vincennes arsenal, Ariane Mnouchkine's Théâtre du Soleil featured some giant rod puppets. In 1973 Dominique Houdart directed Der Tag des großen Gelehrten Wu, which included "giant linear puppets made from aluminium" gesturing with their own manipulation rods and performing together with actors. Between the 1970s and 1990s the Cumbria-based Welfare State International produced giant puppets for processions.

Then in 1990, in the streets of Paris, "some two and a half million spectators gathered in Paris’ Quartier de la Défense to witness huge, exuberantly colourful puppets manipulated to steel band music. As part of a massive festival orchestrated by Jean-Michel Jarre, these immense, mobile skeletons were literally attached to the puppeteers". Giant skeleton puppets have been produced by Processional Arts Workshop from 1998 for New York's Village Halloween Parade. Jean-Luc Courcoult's Royal de Luxe company was started in 1979, but it was in 1993 that the giant marionettes of Le Géant tombé du ciel (or The Giant Who Fell from the Sky) appeared. This involved "a string puppet 9 metres high, encased in mobile scaffolding to which all the points of leverage and manipulation were attached (chords, pulleys, etc). This giant puppet was manipulated by a crowd of "servers" dressed in red livery that jump, pull and generally busy themselves with its levers with perfect coordination". Then in 2000 the same company produced Les Chasseurs de girafes ( or The Giraffe Hunters) in which "the largest giraffe was 12 metres tall, needing twenty manipulators, with six using pneumatic jack handles".

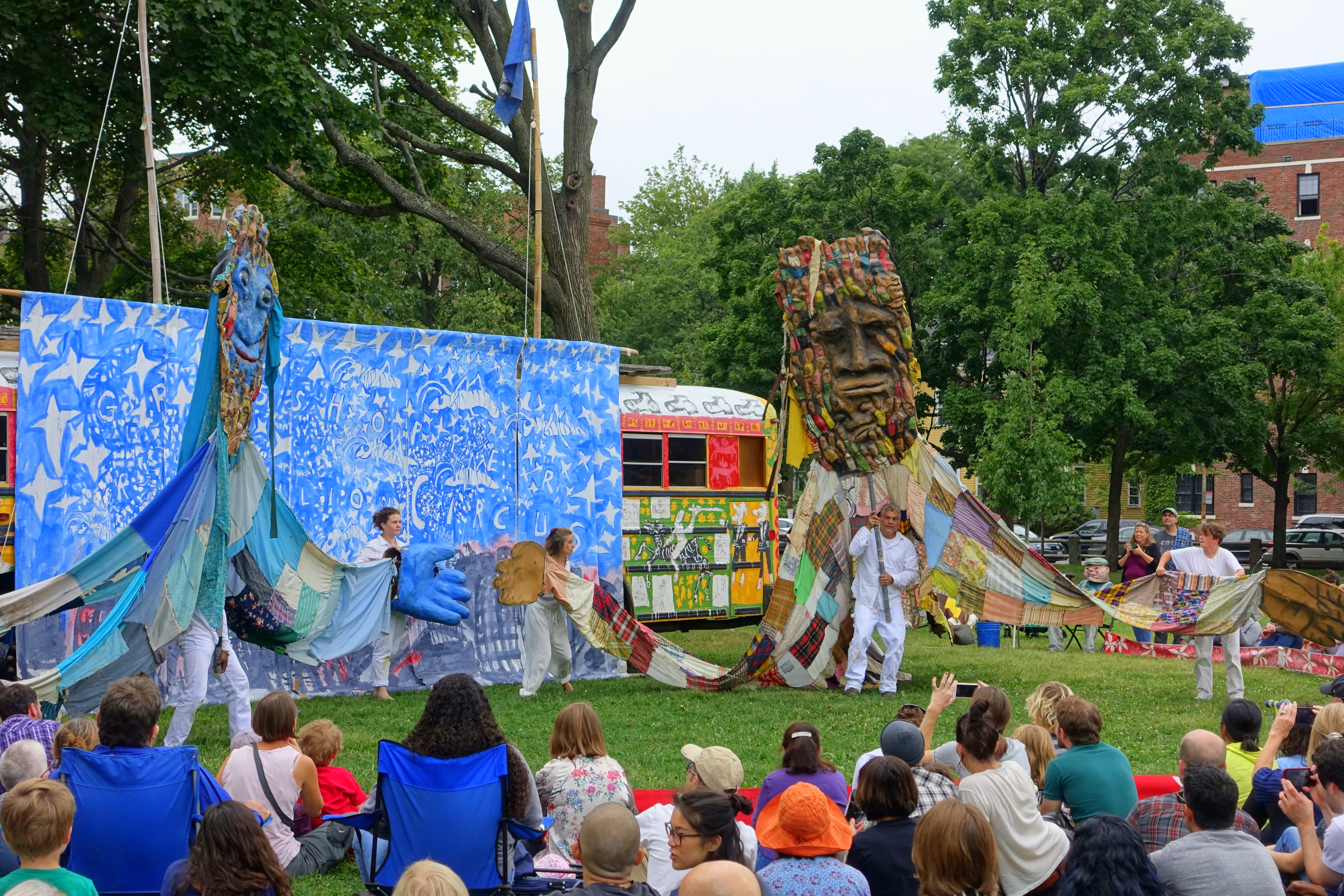
Bread and Puppet Theater, Cambridge, Massachusetts, 2018

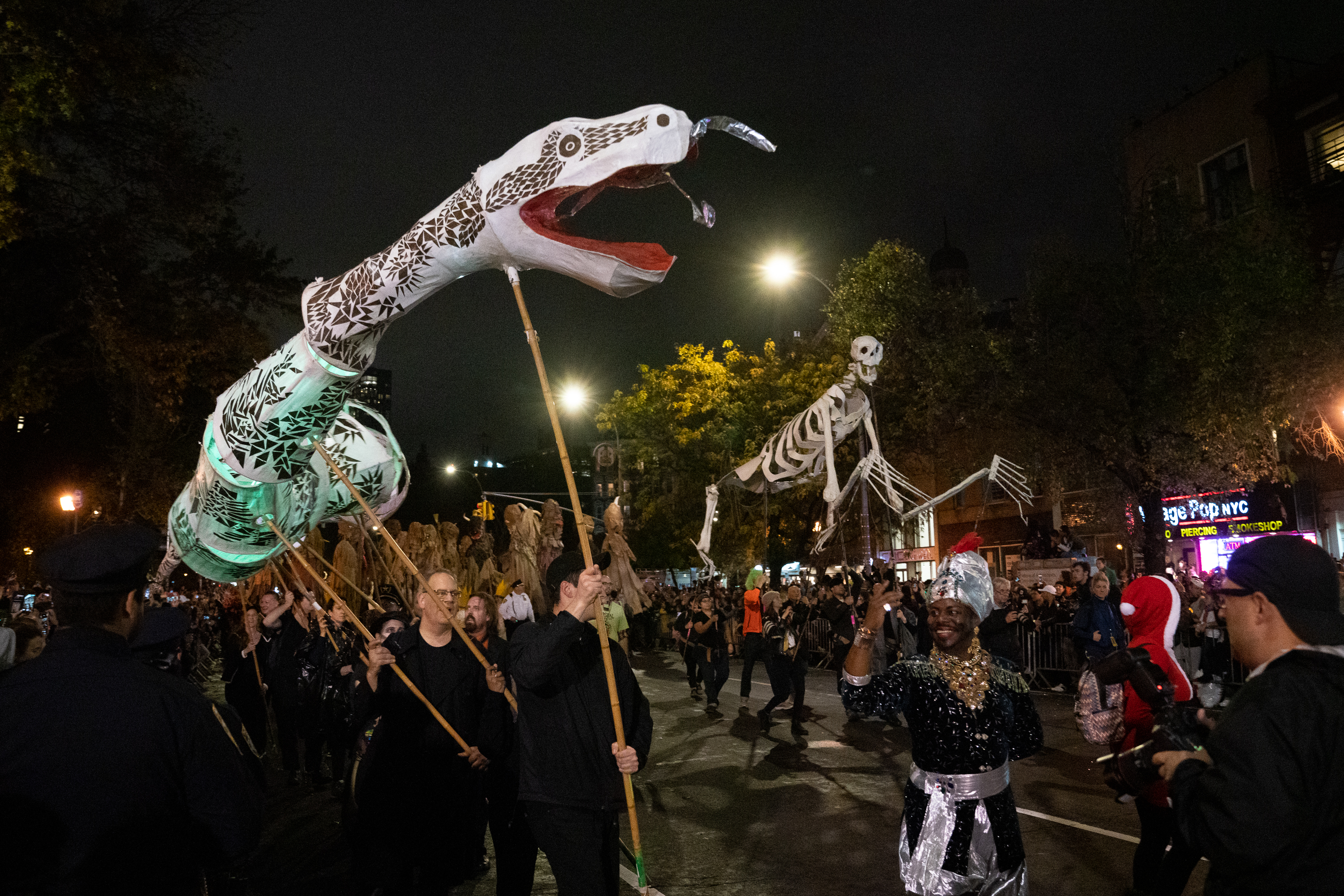
New York's Village Halloween Parade, Skeleton and monster puppet, 2019

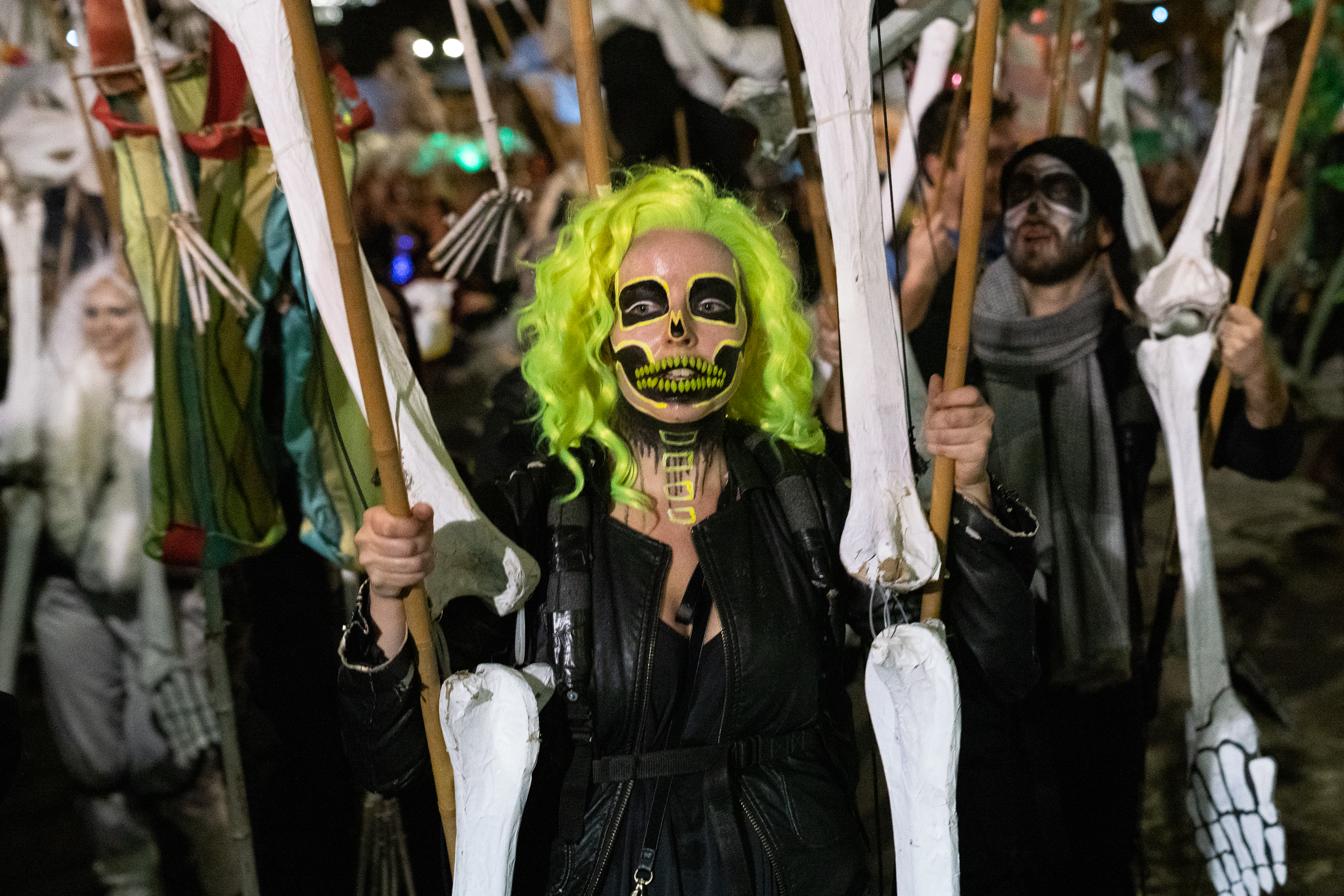
New York's Village Halloween Parade, Puppeteer carrying and controlling a skeleton puppet, 2019

=== 21st century ===
David Solnit of Art And Revolutions produced giant puppets for a protest in Seattle against the World Trade Organization in 2000. The opening ceremony of the Athens Olympic Games in 2004 featured "a gigantic head exemplifying Cycladic art emerging from the water. Opening into several pieces, a kouros statue appeared, which itself then separated into several pieces, revealing a third form. These sculptures are of interest for their use of string manipulation run by computer programmes and connected by electric pylons". In 2006 the Danish puppet maker Maria Lexa produced giant Sun and Moon puppets for a performance in Berkeley, California.

In 2014 La Machine displayed two of its giant mechanical puppets, the 20-foot-wide (6.1 m) spider La Princess and the 46-ton fire-breathing dragon horse Long Ma in Beijing. Golden Tree Productions' 40-ton Man Engine, "the largest mechanical puppet ever made in Britain", representing a Cornish Tin Miner, was commissioned by the Cornwall Mining World Heritage Site for their "Tinth" anniversary. It toured Cornwall in 2016, and visited other British venues in 2018. It is 11 metres (36.1 feet) high, and it is worked by at least twelve puppeteers. "[The] Man Engine has a giant beam engine as a rocking neck, mining head gear sheave wheels as shoulders, cast-iron flanges and rivets throughout and hands that reflect massive 20th-century excavators". It was made in Cornwall.

Vision Mechanics' giant puppet Storm, which has been toured in Scotland and elsewhere since 2020, represents issues associated with climate change. During the 2020 Summer Olympics in Tokyo, the giant string-puppet Mocco was "the centrepiece of the 2020 Nippon festival". In 2020 in Prague, LED artists paraded bright, internally-lit puppets on poles. The Handspring Puppet Company's giant stilt puppet Little Amal was toured across Europe and the United Kingdom in 2021 as the centrepiece of a project called The Walk, demonstrating a positive view of the lone child refugee. Trigger Productions Limited of Bristol produced The Hatchling, a giant pterosaur-shaped dragon puppet, of kite construction, which processed through the streets and then flew over the sea at Plymouth, England, in 2021. In the same year in Siem Reap, Cambodia, The Giant Puppet Project was in its second decade of teaching children to create rod-manipulated giant puppets, of similar construction to the Dragon dance puppets of China.

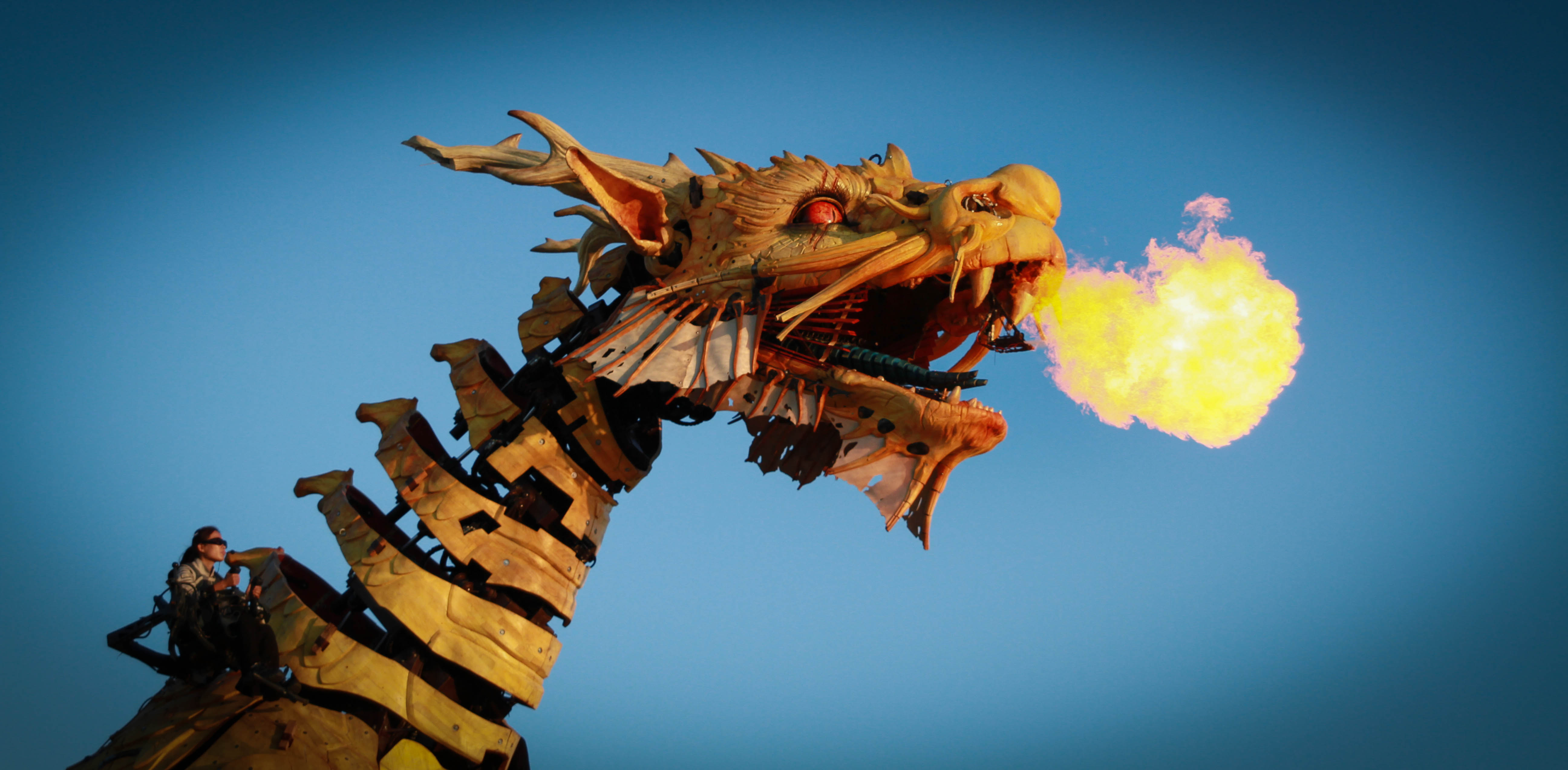
Long Ma in 2015

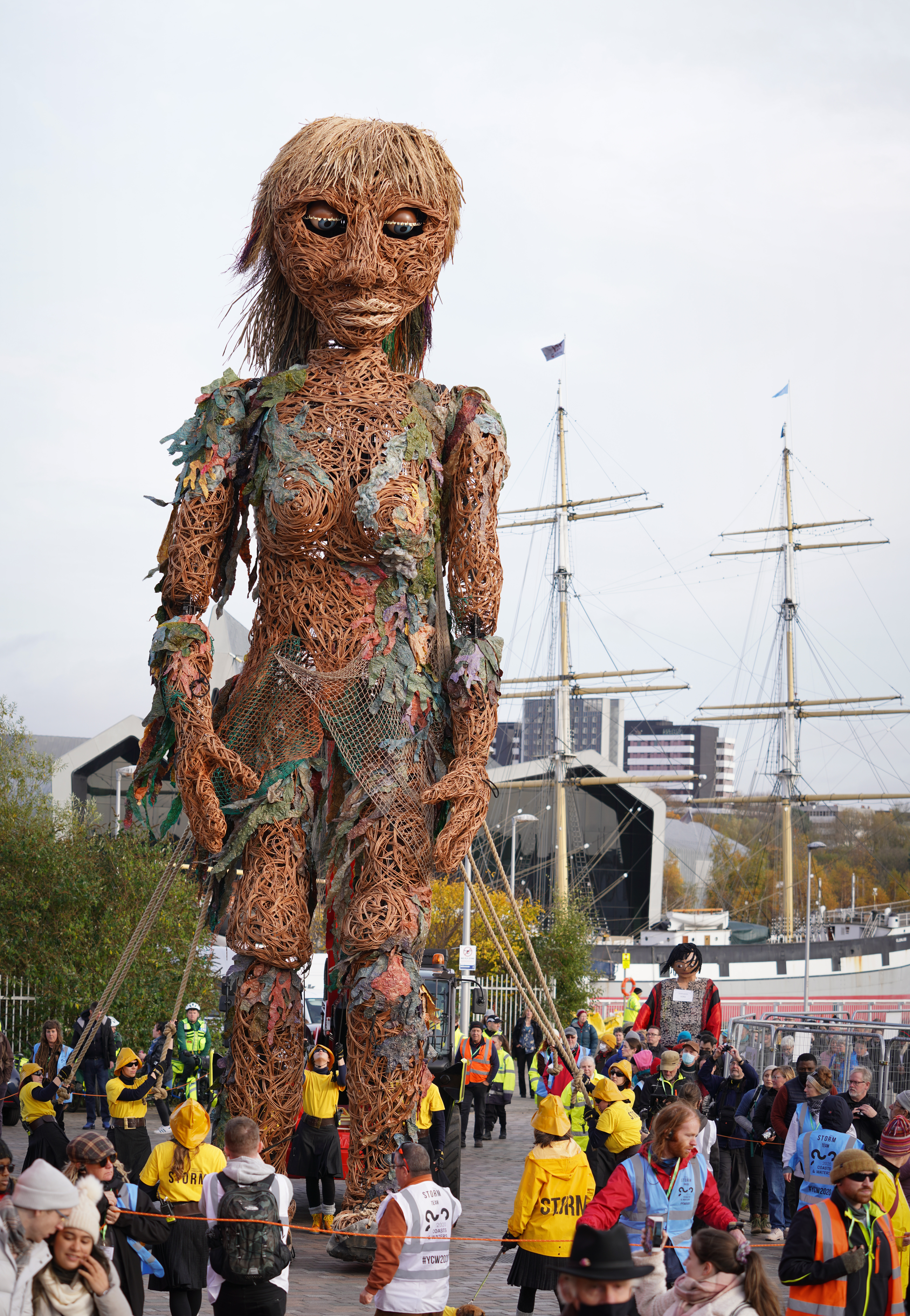
Storm in 2021

== Manipulation of giant puppets ==
=== Manipulation rods ===
Rod manipulation by visible puppeteers, from underneath or beside the giant puppet, can provide both support and movement. The Théâtre du Soleil and the Bread and Puppet Theater have used rod puppets, as did Dominique Houdart in The Day of the Great Scholar Wu. The best-known rod puppet today is the traditional Chinese Dragon New Year puppet. The arms of the giant puppet Little Amal are controlled by rods. Trigger Productions' kite-constructed dragon puppet The Hatchling was manipulated by rods while walking on land in 2021.

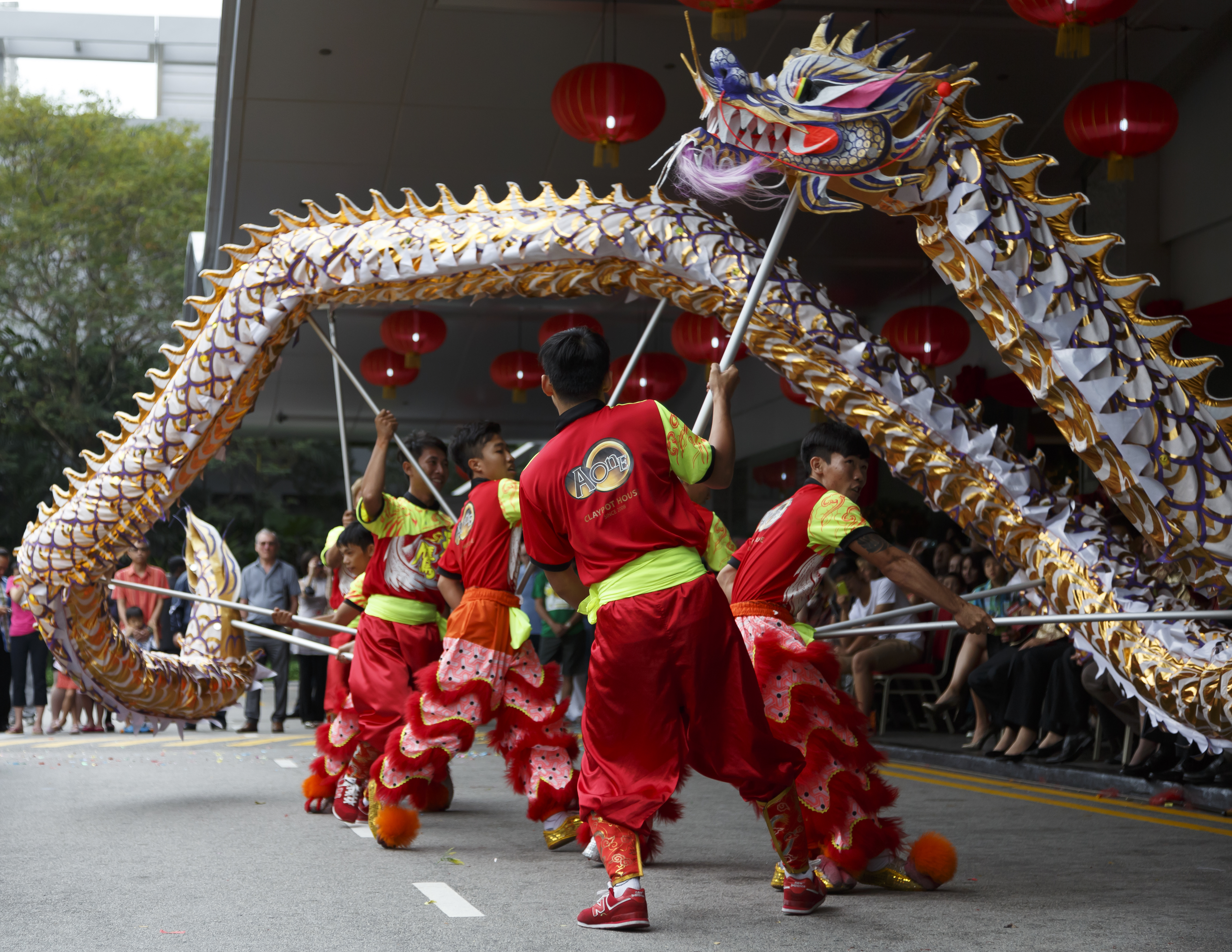
Chinese New Year Dragon Dance, Singapore, 2015

=== String manipulation ===
Royal de Luxe's The Giant Who Fell from the Sky (1992) and other projects used giant string puppets.

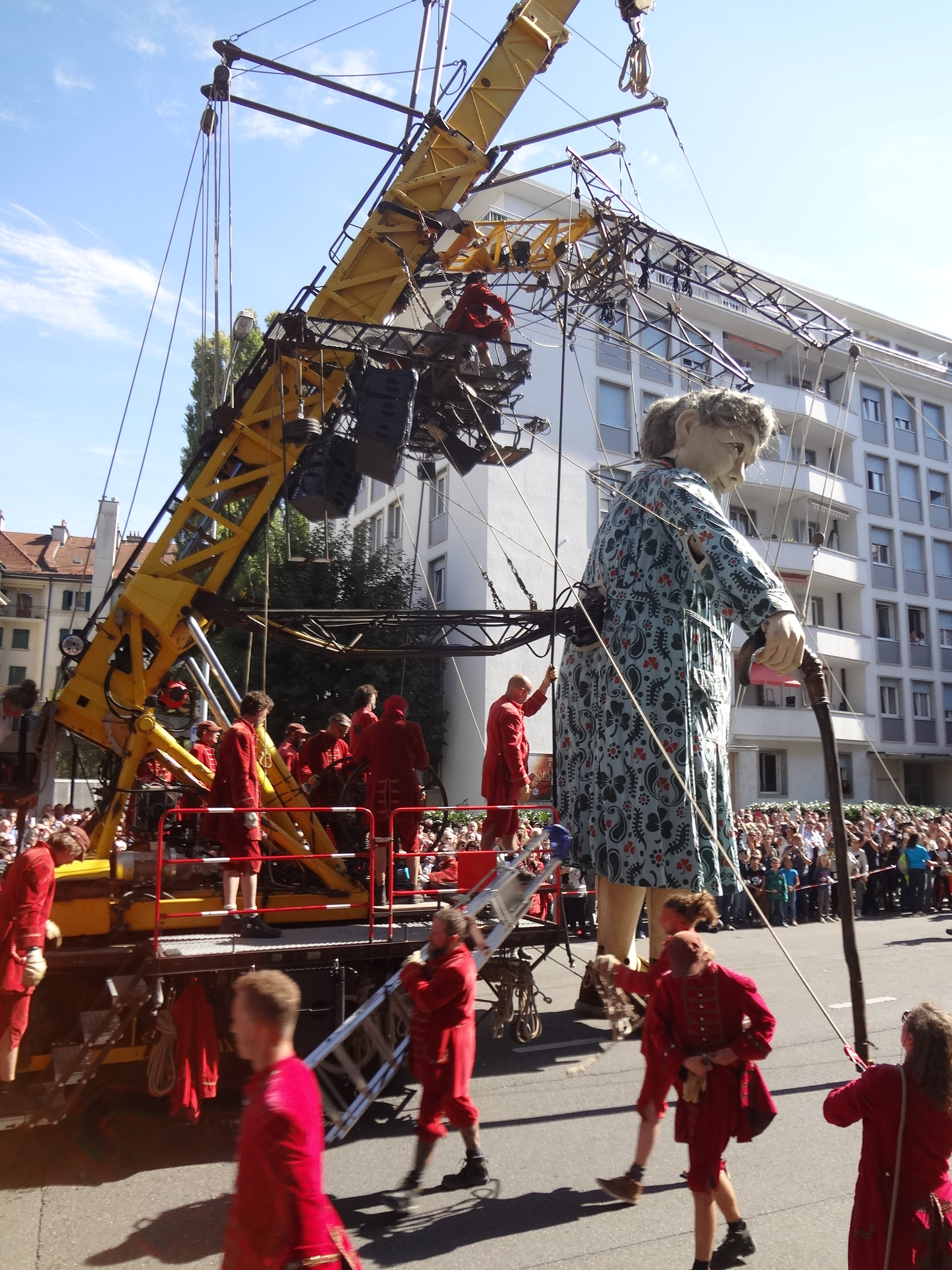
Grandmother, Geneva, 2017

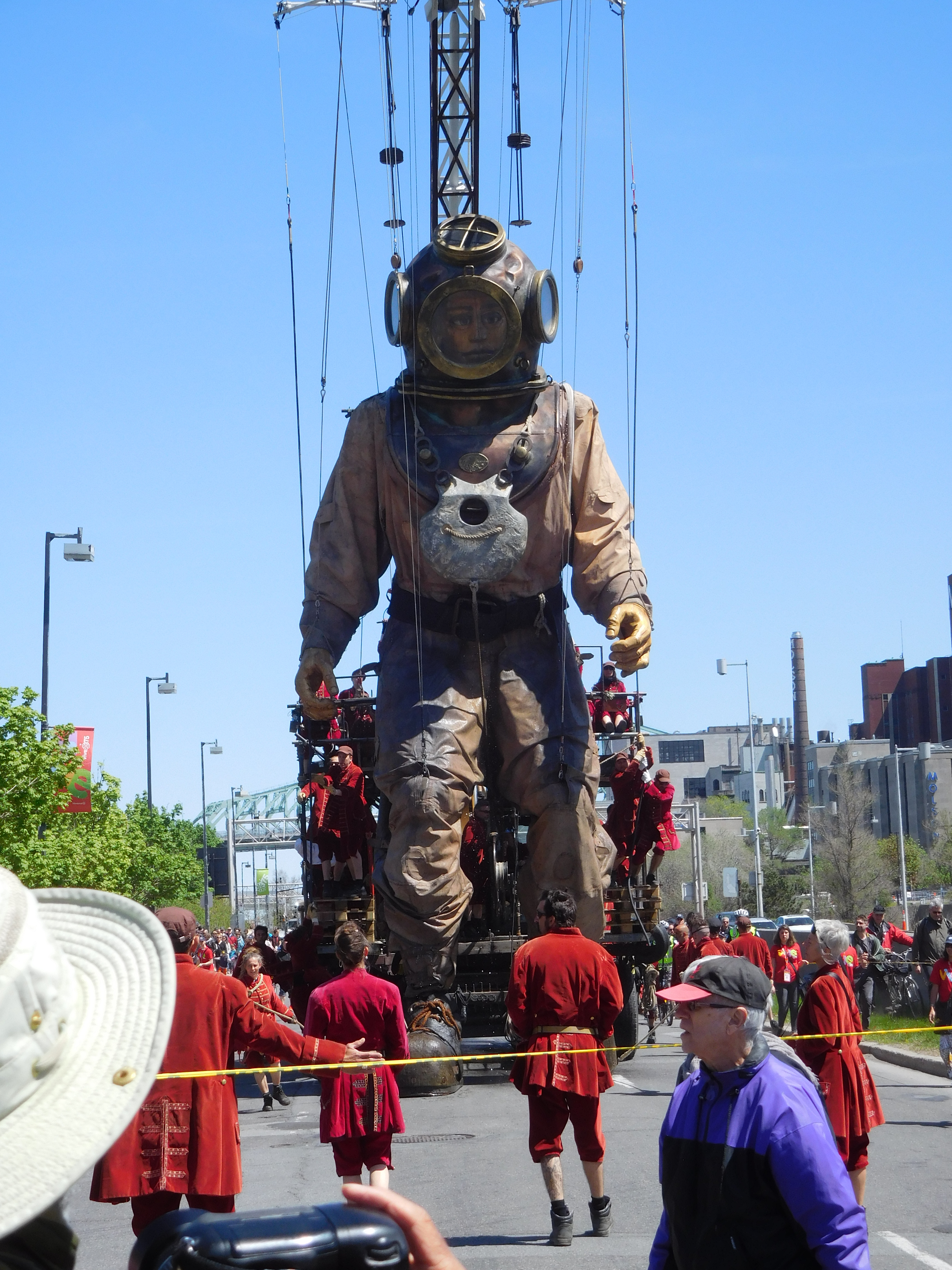
Diver, Montreal, 2017

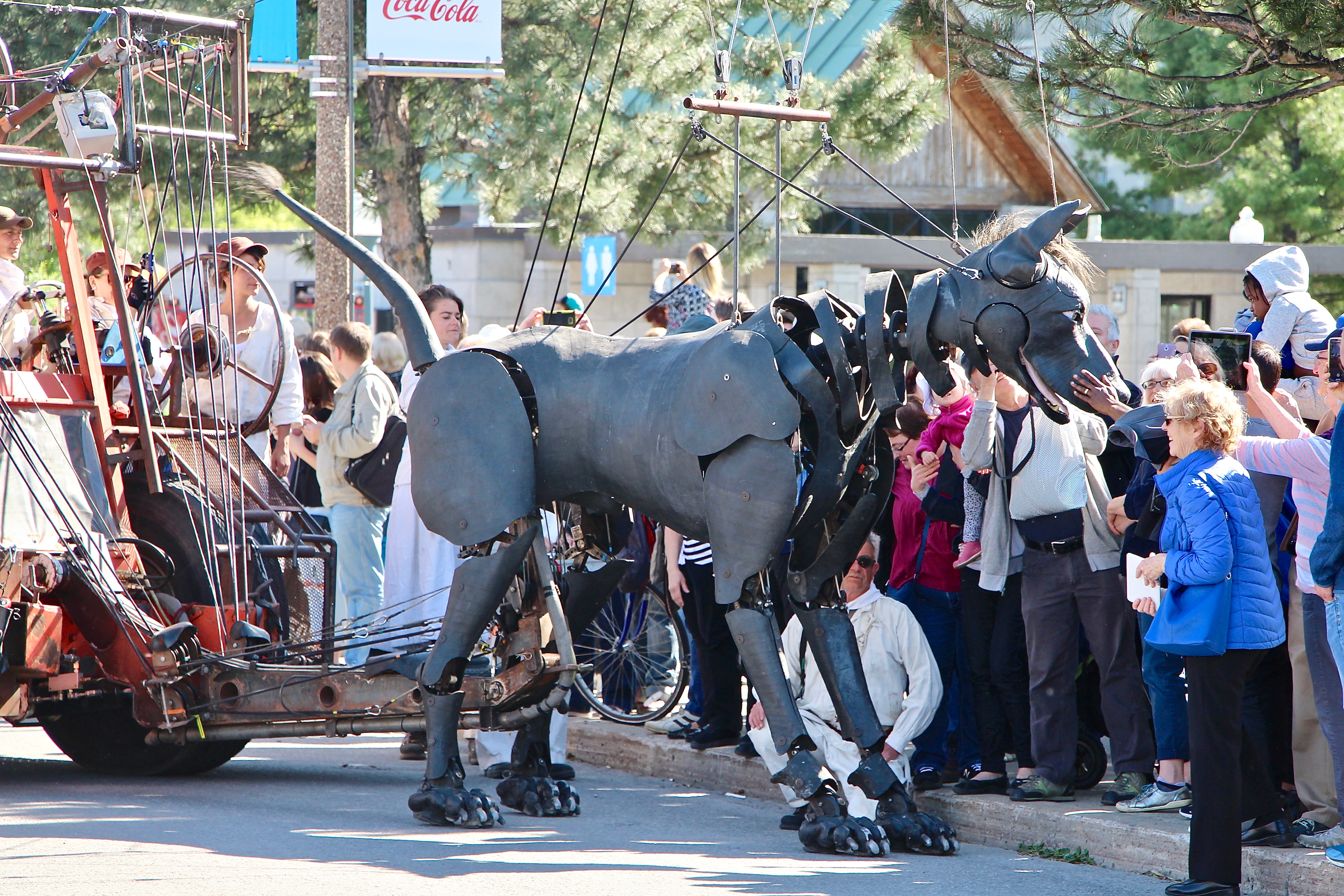
Xolo the dog, Montreal, 2017

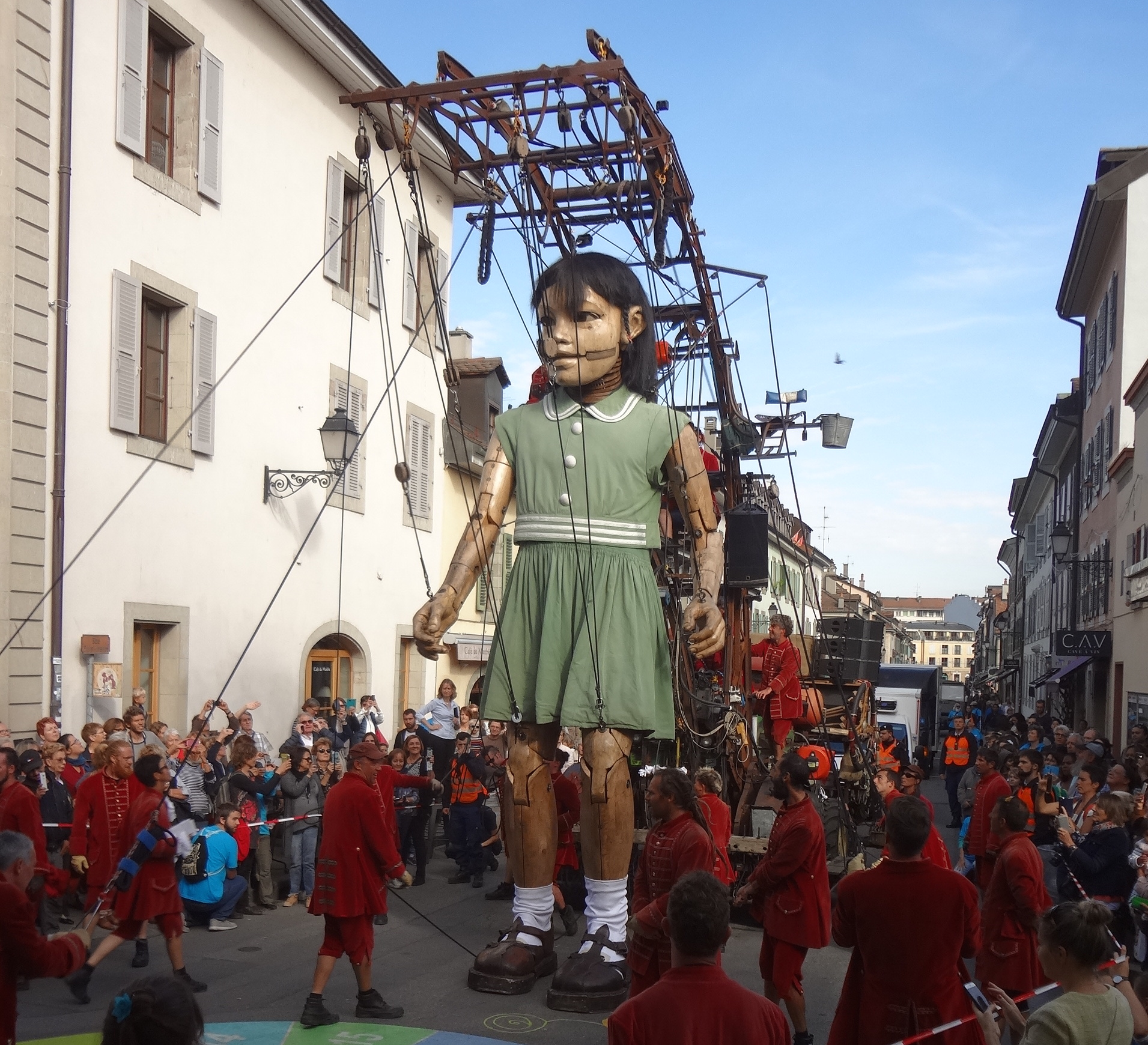
Little Giant, Geneva, 2017

=== Stilts ===
The giant puppet Little Amal incorporates an interior puppeteer on stilts, which are contained within the puppet's legs. The puppet has ten sets of legs to fit ten individual interior puppeteers.

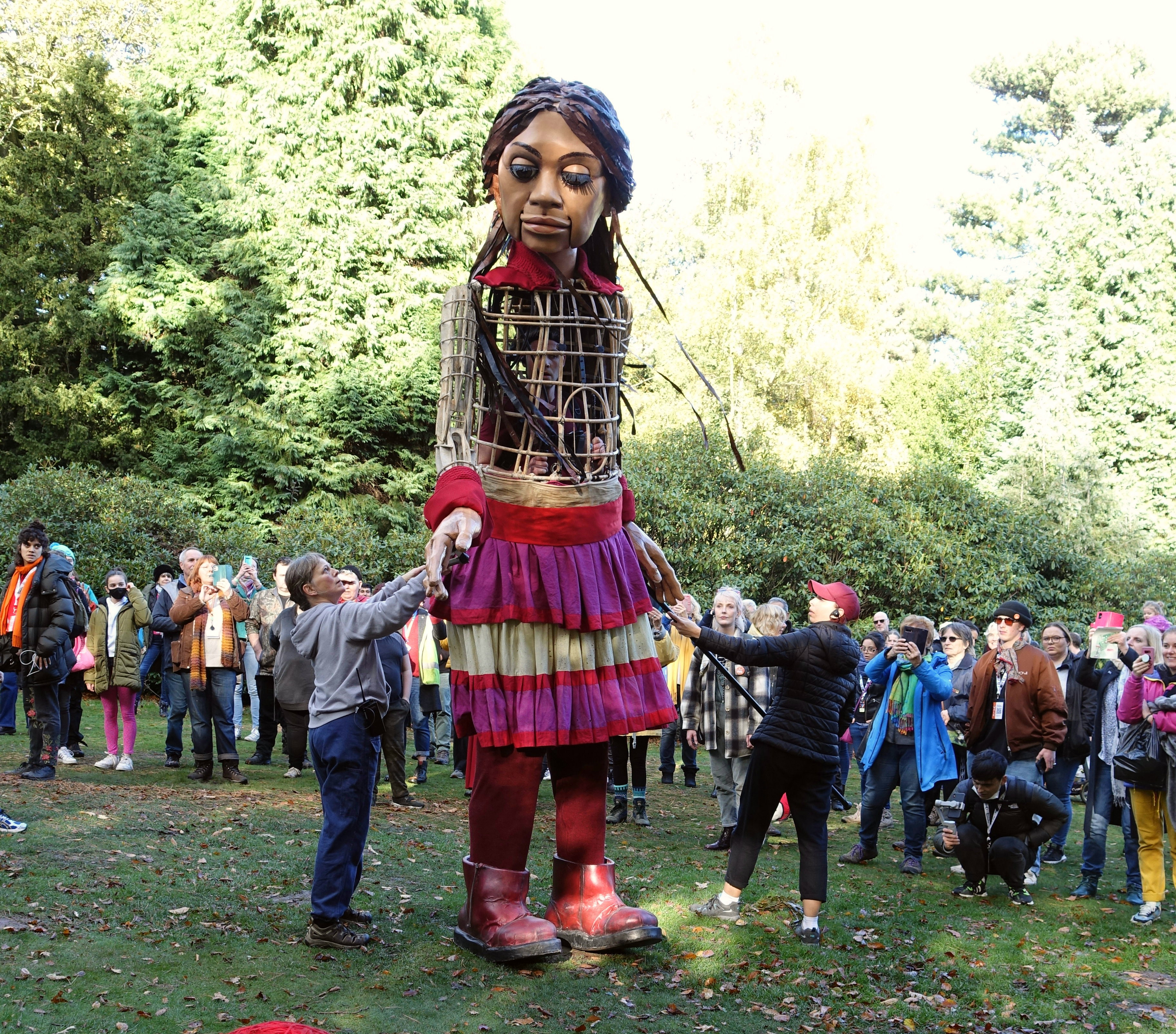
Little Amal with internal puppeteer on stilts, and puppeteers with rods, Barnsley, 2021

=== Controls for kites ===
When the giant dragon puppet The Hatchling, built as a kite, flew over Plymouth Sound in 2021, she was initially lifted manually from Plymouth Hoe by puppeteers, then the vessel St Nicholas held her lines and flew her as a kite from above Plymouth Hoe across Plymouth Sound to the shore where she was retrieved.

=== Floats ===
Where giant puppets are unable to walk by themselves, or where a giant walking puppet needs to be depicted sitting or lying down, they can be carried on floats, with only their head and hands being manipulated by puppeteers.

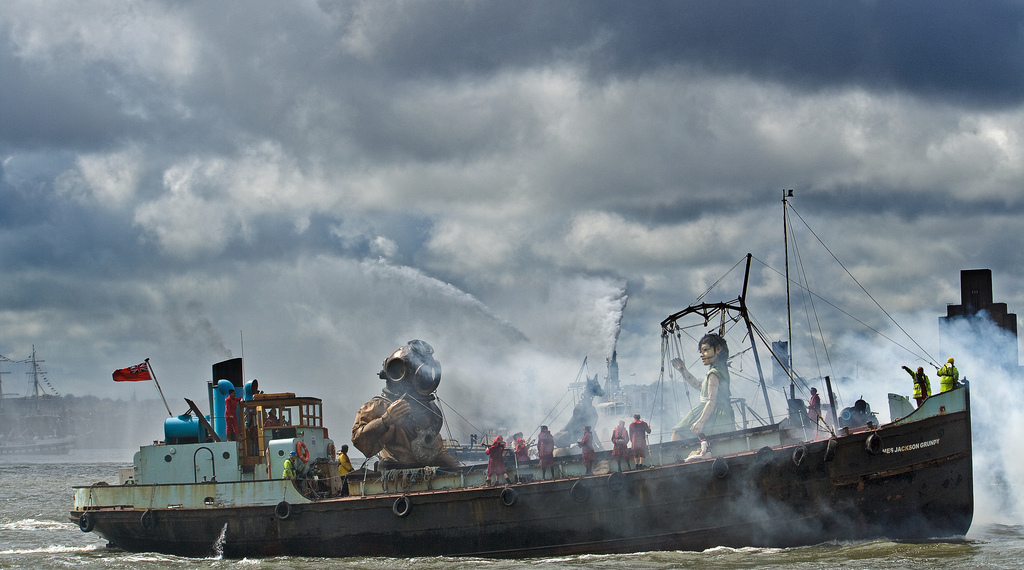
Royal de Luxe used a boat-float on the Mersey for three giant puppets in 2012

=== Other puppet controls ===
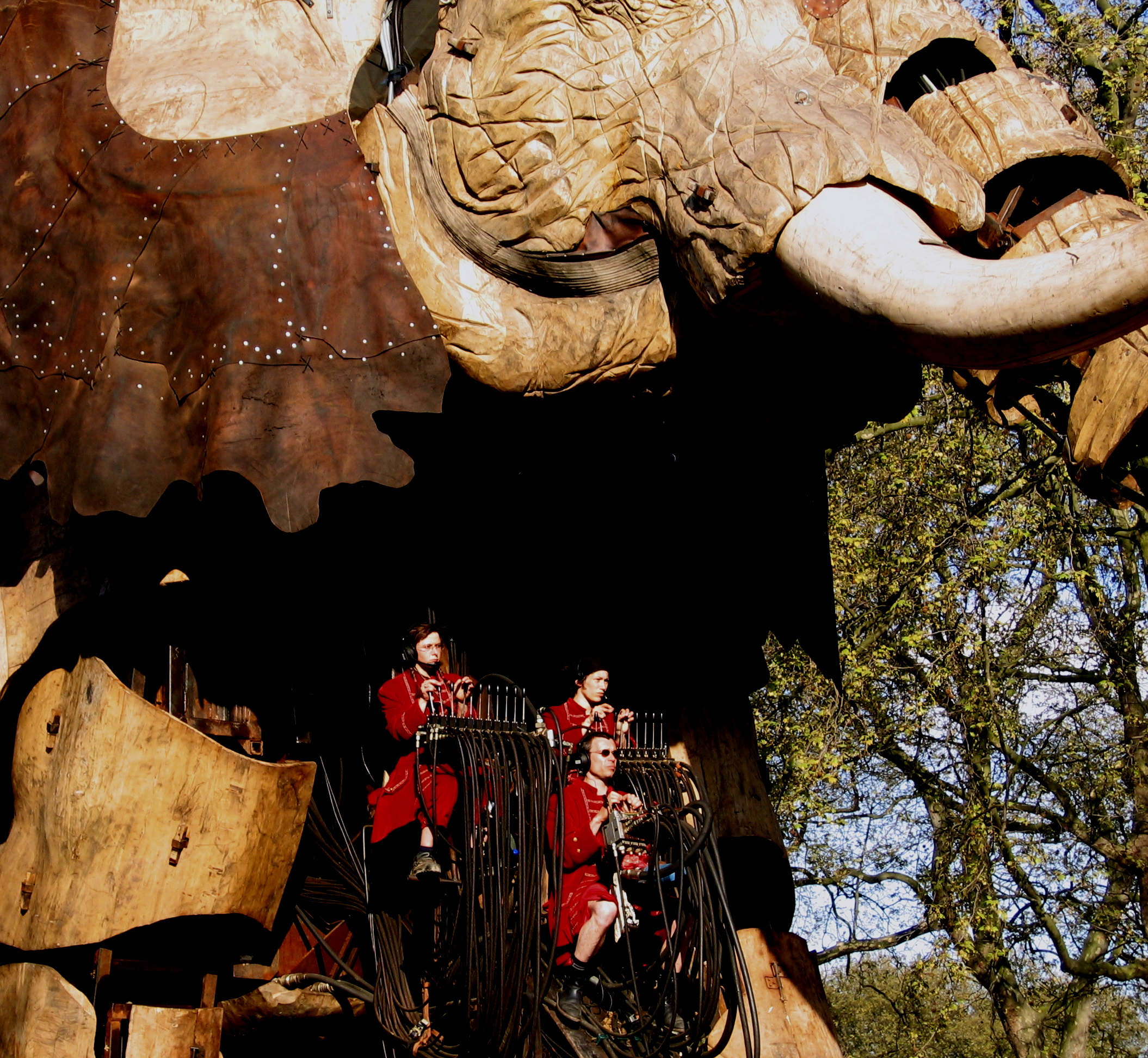
Puppeteers controlling the head of Royal de Luxe's Elephant, London, 2016

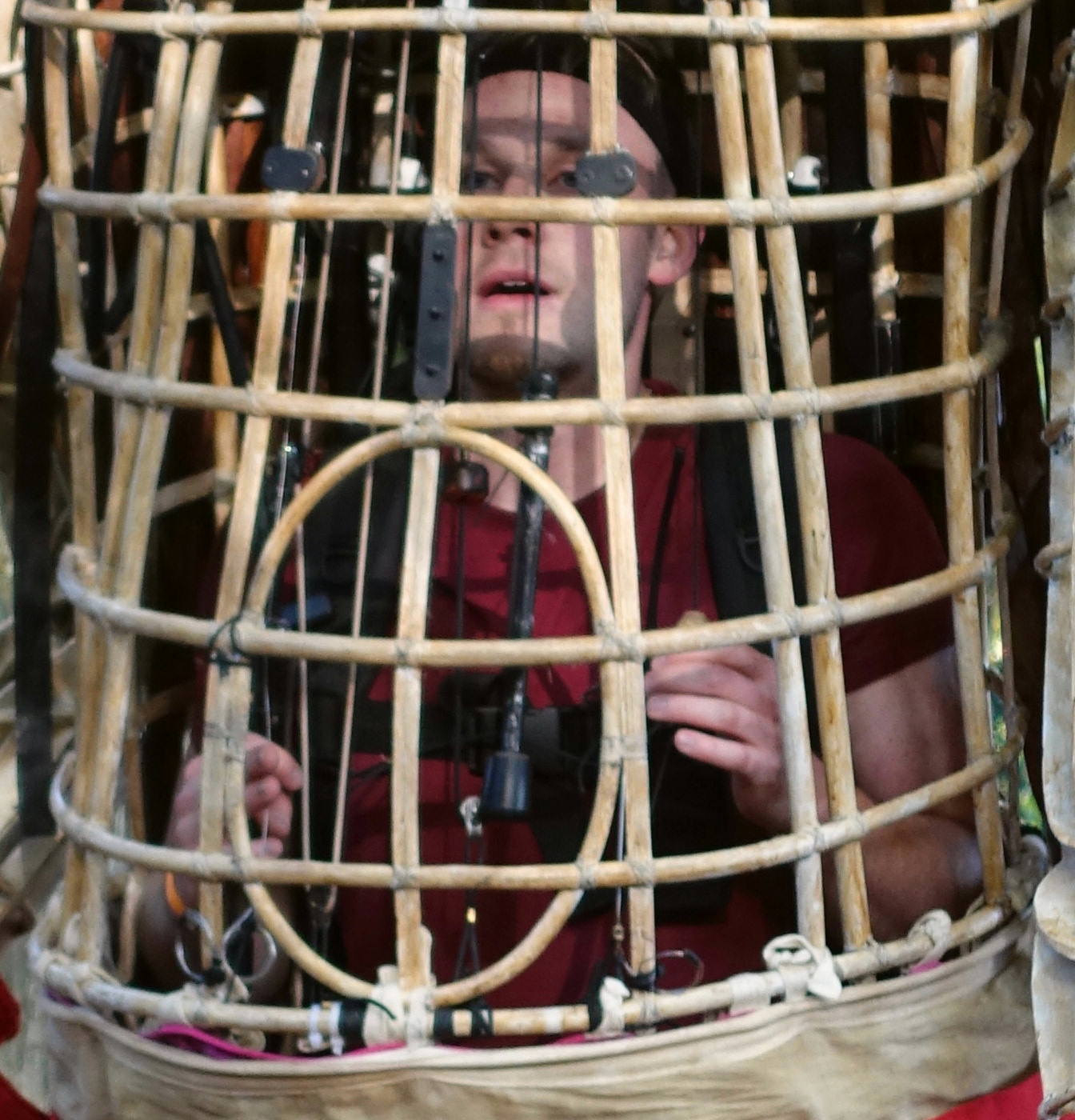
Little Amal's internal puppeteer controlling her head via the Harp mechanism, Barnsley, 2021

== See also ==
- Puppet
- Processional giant
- Processional giants and dragons in Belgium and France
- The Sultan's Elephant
