= Muru =

Muru may refer to:

== People ==
- Muru (surname), a list of Estonian people with the surname Muru
- Rick Muru, a New Zealand rugby league footballer

== Places ==
- Muru-Astráin, a locality in the municipality of Cizur in Navarre province, Spain
- Muru, Estonia, a village in Sõmeru Parish in Lääne-Viru County, Estonia
- Muru, Iran, a village in Zarand County in Kerman Province, Iran
- Muru (Lom), a river in Innlandet county, Norway
- Muru, Nepal, a village in the Western Rukum District of Karnali Province, Nepal
- Muru River, a river of Acre state in western Brazil
- Mount Muru, a sandstone mountain located in Sarawak, Malaysia

== Film ==
- Muru (film), a 2022 film directed by Tearepa Kahi

== Other ==
- Muru (Māori concept), a traditional concept of compensation in Māori culture
- Muru-D, an Australian startup accelerator founded in 2013
- Muru language, a dialect language spoken in Chad
