= Platinum Jubilee Pageant =

June 2022 Event

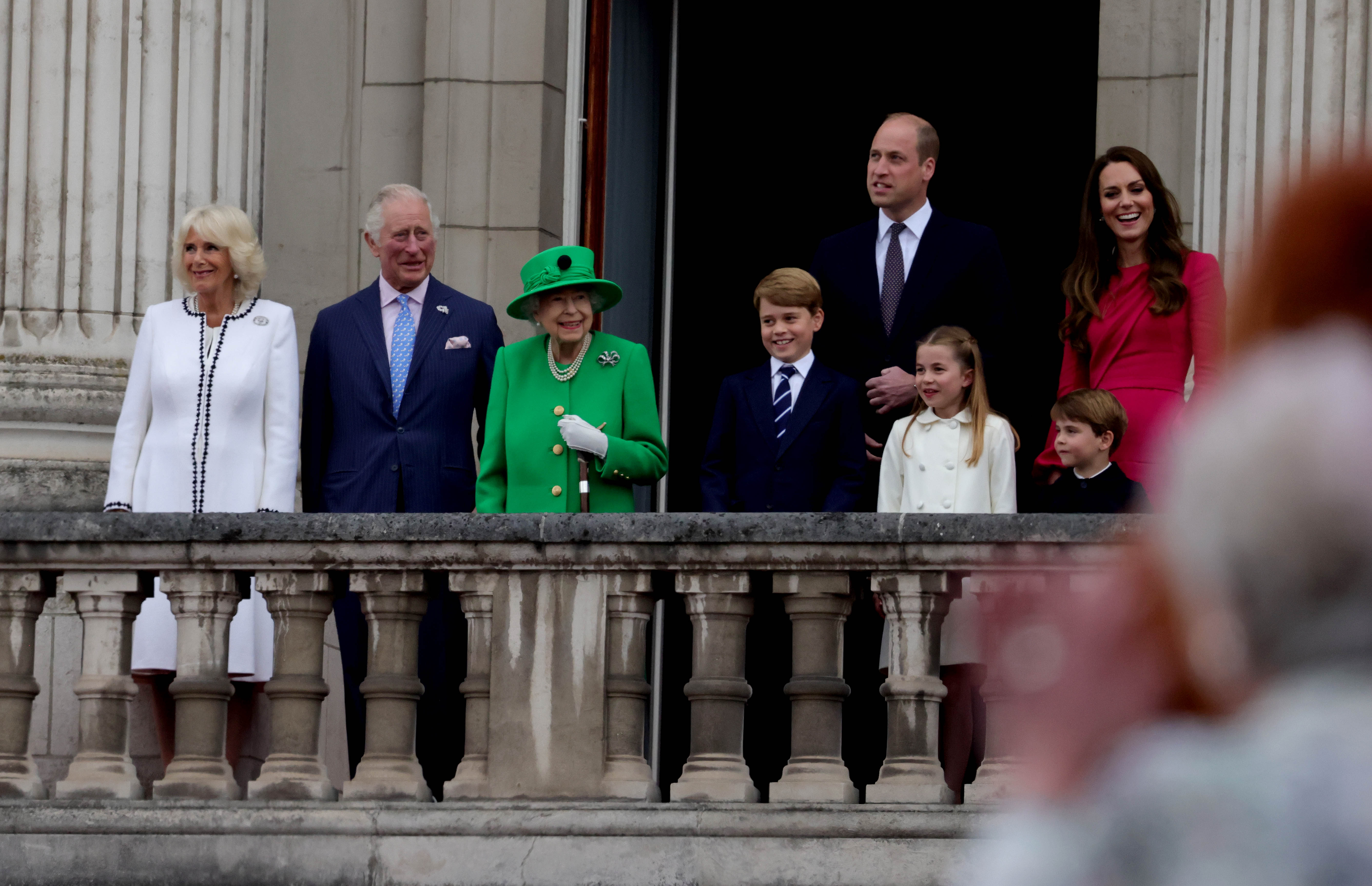
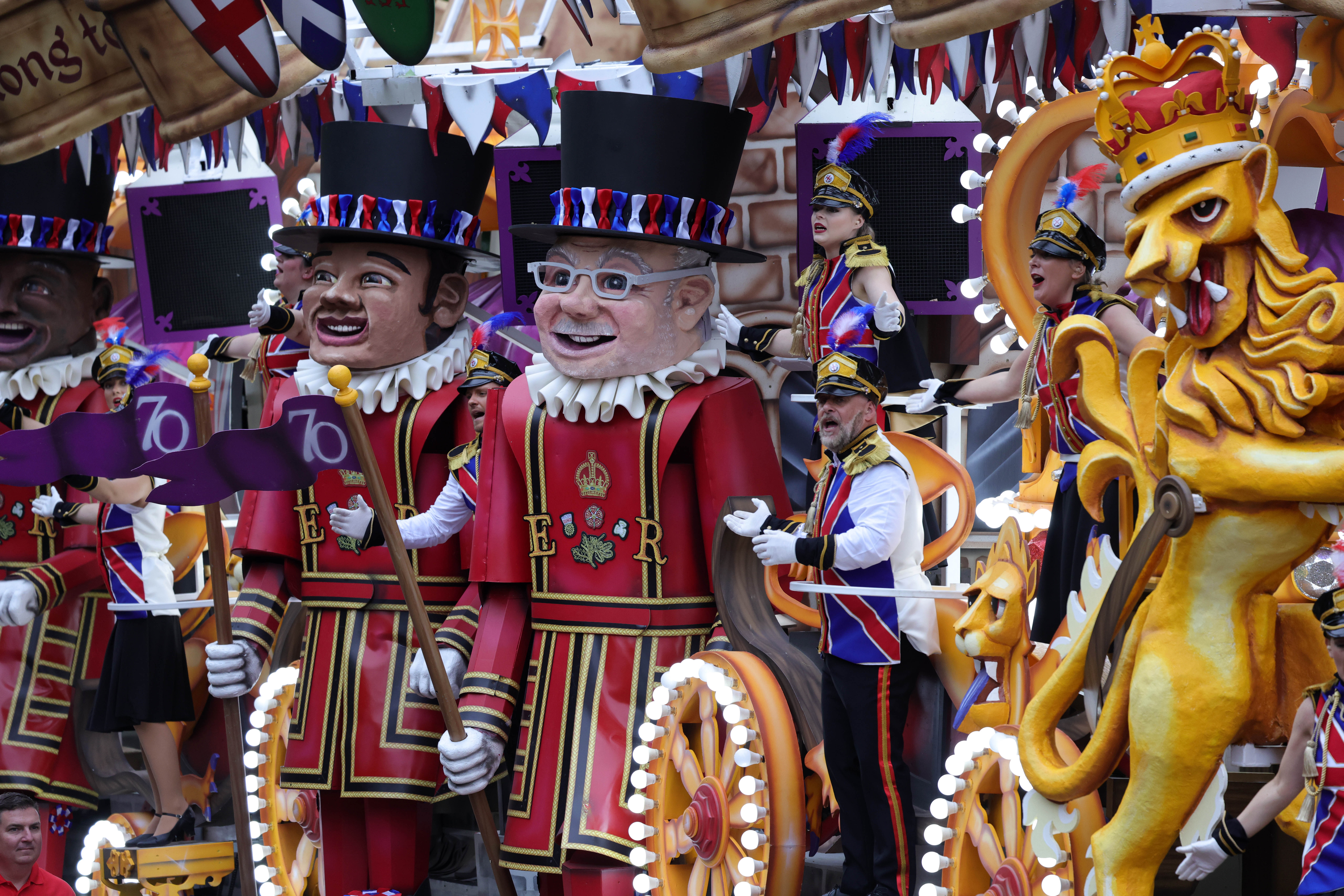
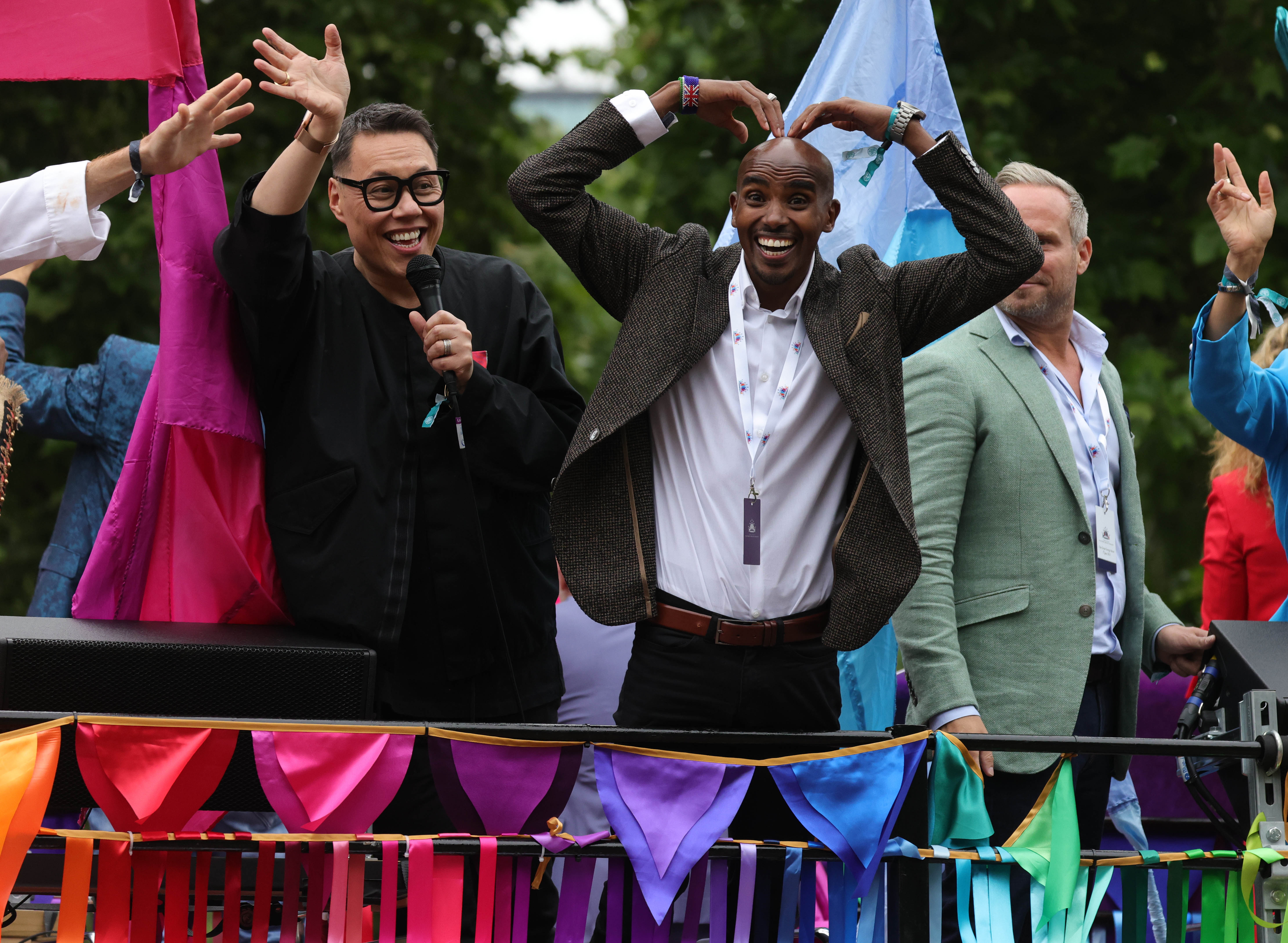
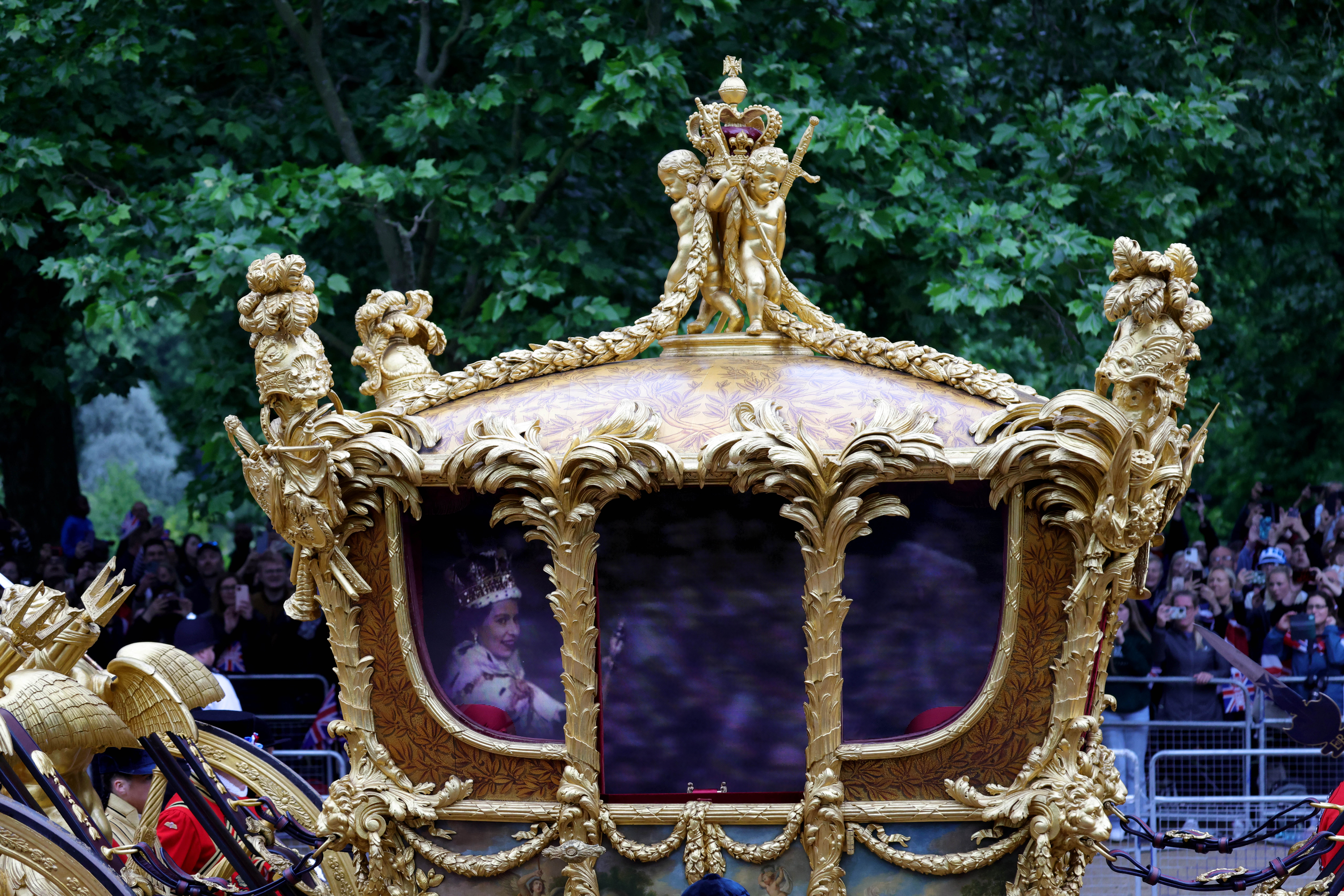
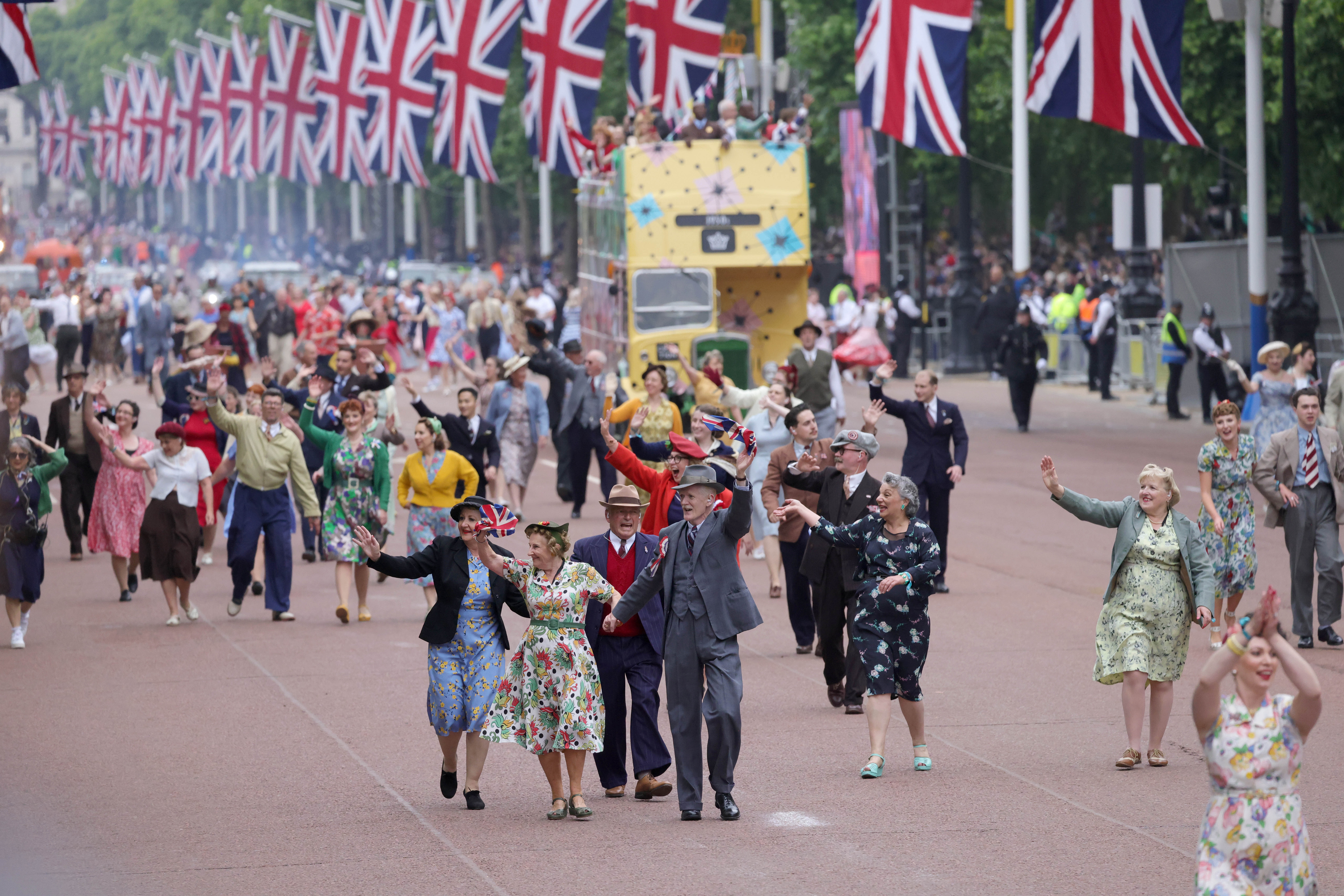
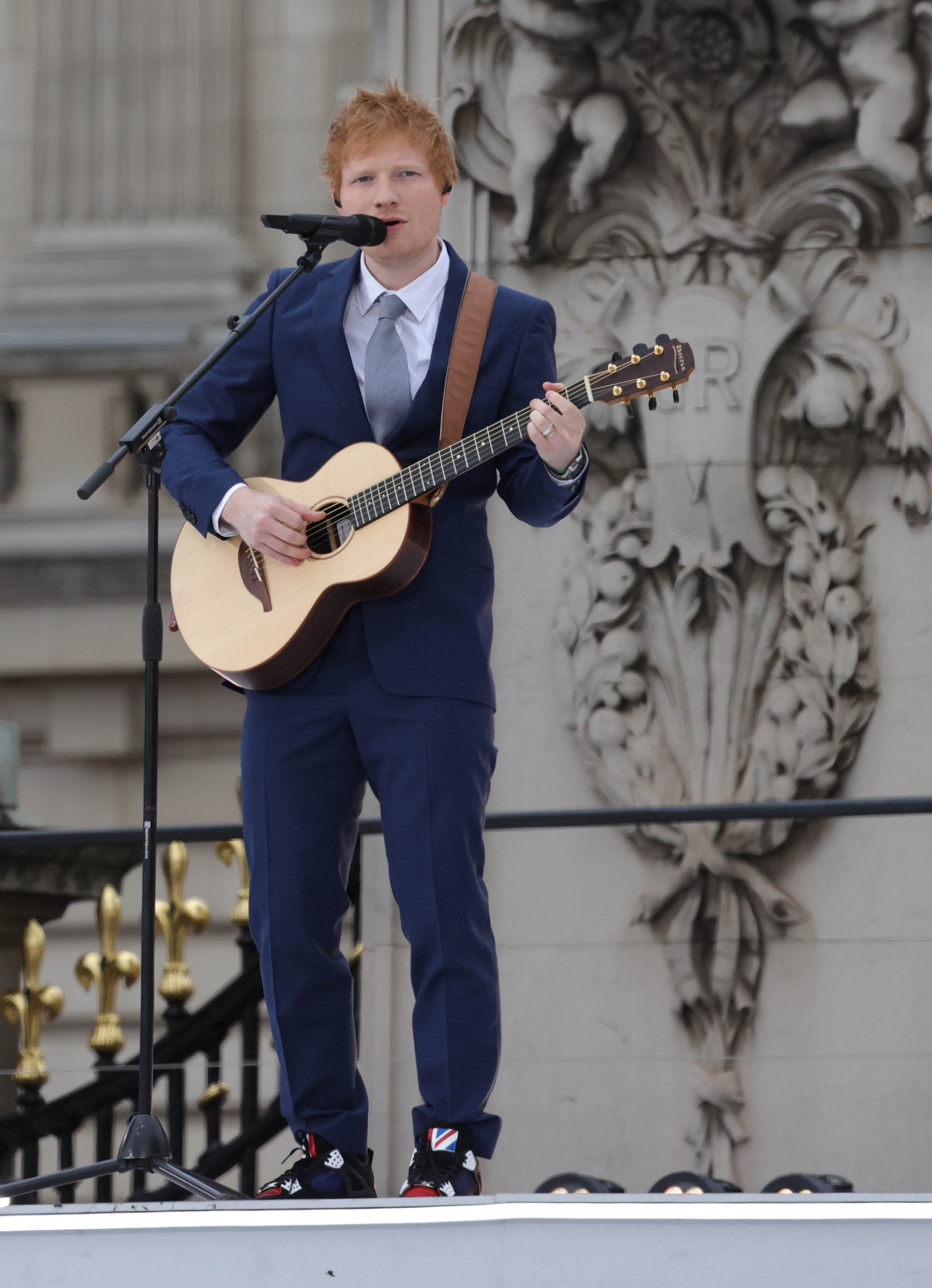
- Date: 5 June 2022
- Venue: London, United Kingdom
- Theme: Platinum Jubilee of Queen Elizabeth II

The Platinum Jubilee Pageant was held on Sunday, 5 June 2022 near Buckingham Palace, as part of Queen Elizabeth II's Platinum Jubilee celebrations. Conceived and directed by David Zolkwer with Pageant Master, Adrian Evans, it featured over 10,000 people from across the United Kingdom and the Commonwealth and combined street arts, music, puppets, carnival and costume to celebrate the Queen's reign, as well as honouring the collective service of people and communities across the United Kingdom.

== Date and location ==
The pageant was a major event of the 2022 Platinum Jubilee celebrations for Queen Elizabeth II. It took place on 5 June 2022, a Sunday and the last day of the extended Jubilee weekend. The money for the event, which was estimated to cost £15 million, was raised from corporate sponsors and individuals.

The event was broadcast by the BBC and had a peak viewing figure of 8.7 million and an average audience of 6.3 million people.

== Preparation ==
Pageant attendees with vehicles (including Daleks, motorbikes and bicycles) the buses and the celebrities riding them, first assembled at Horse Guards Parade in the early morning to prepare for the Pageant. This also included numerous interviews with news crews and journalists.

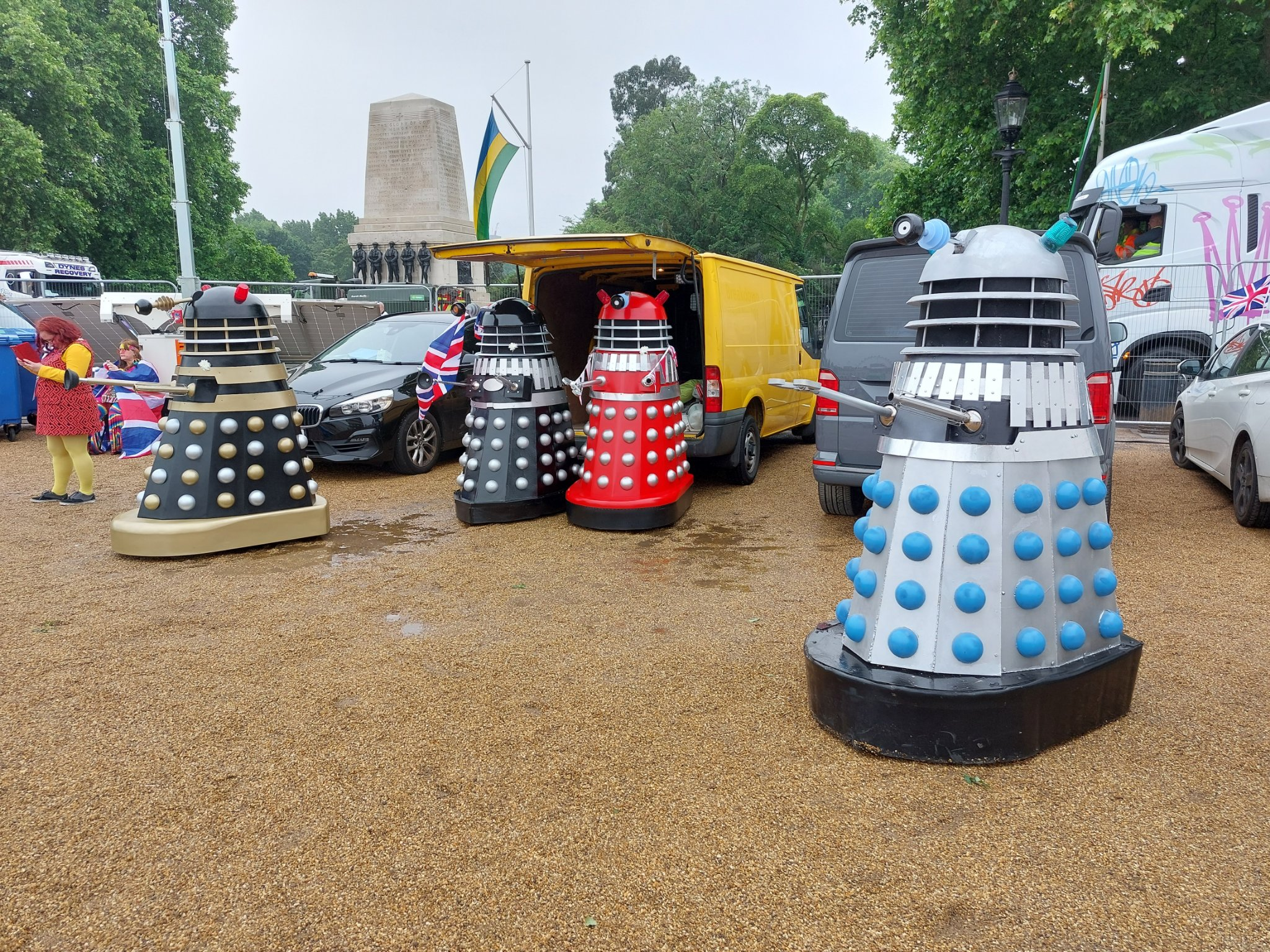

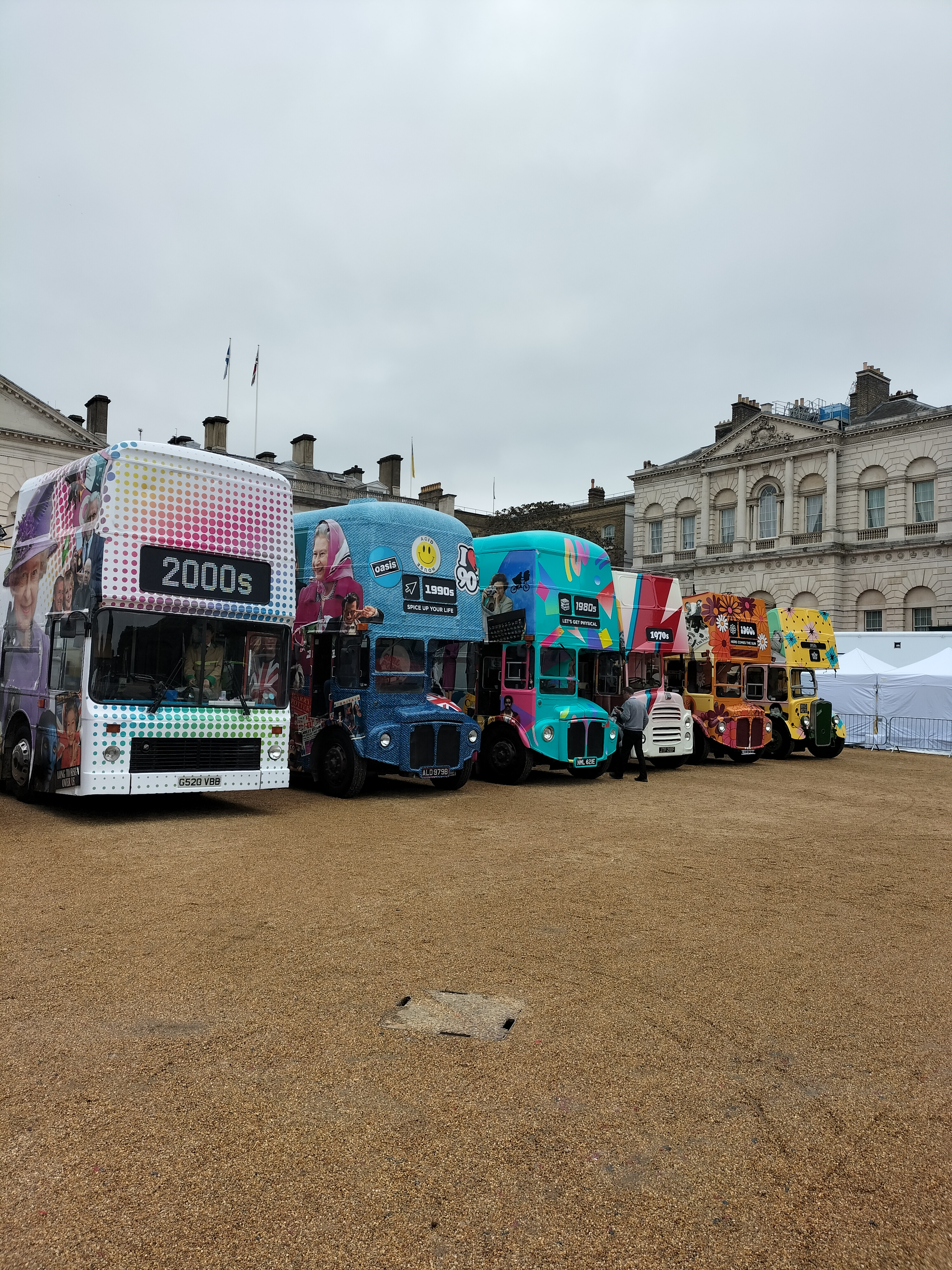

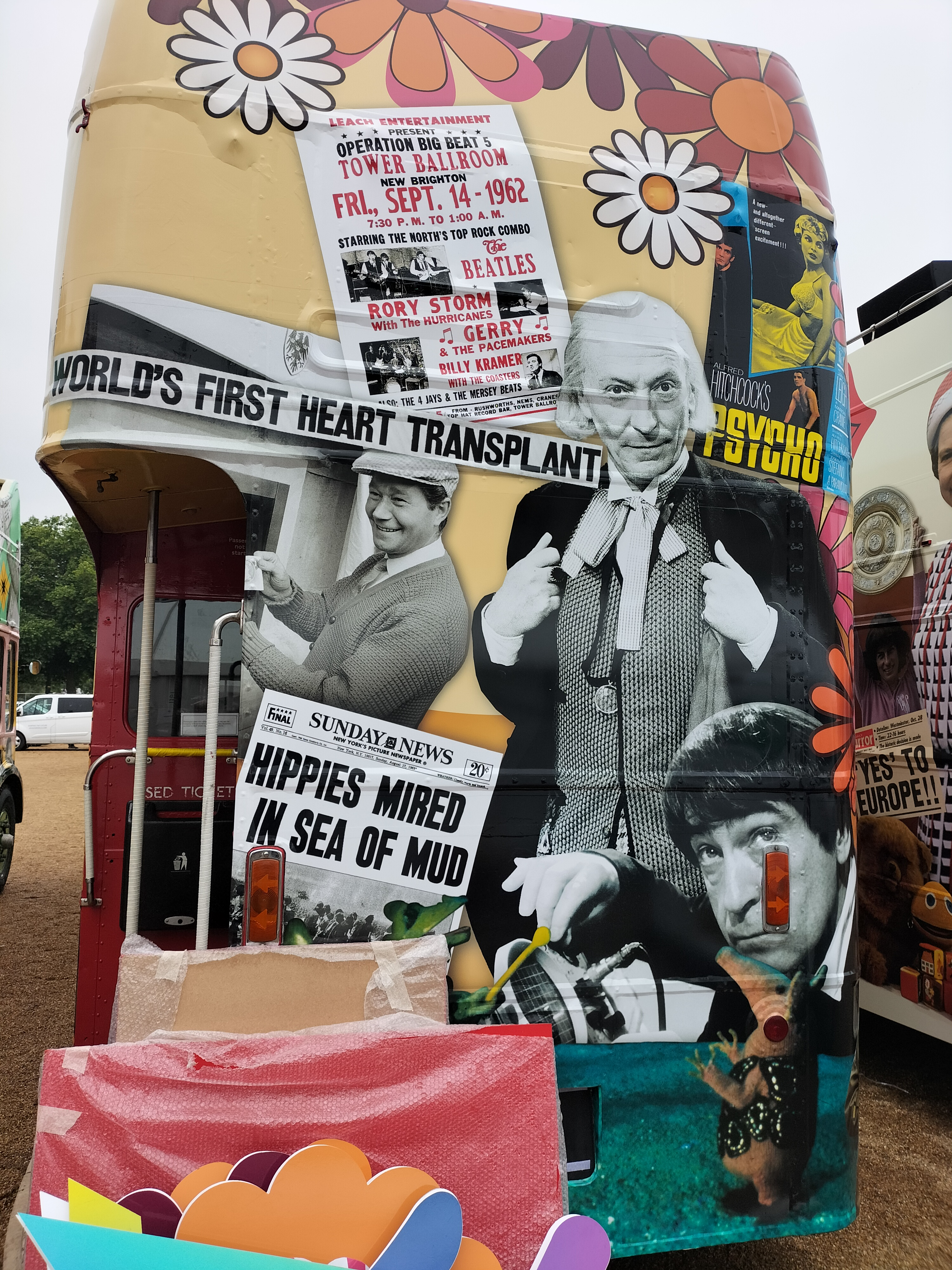
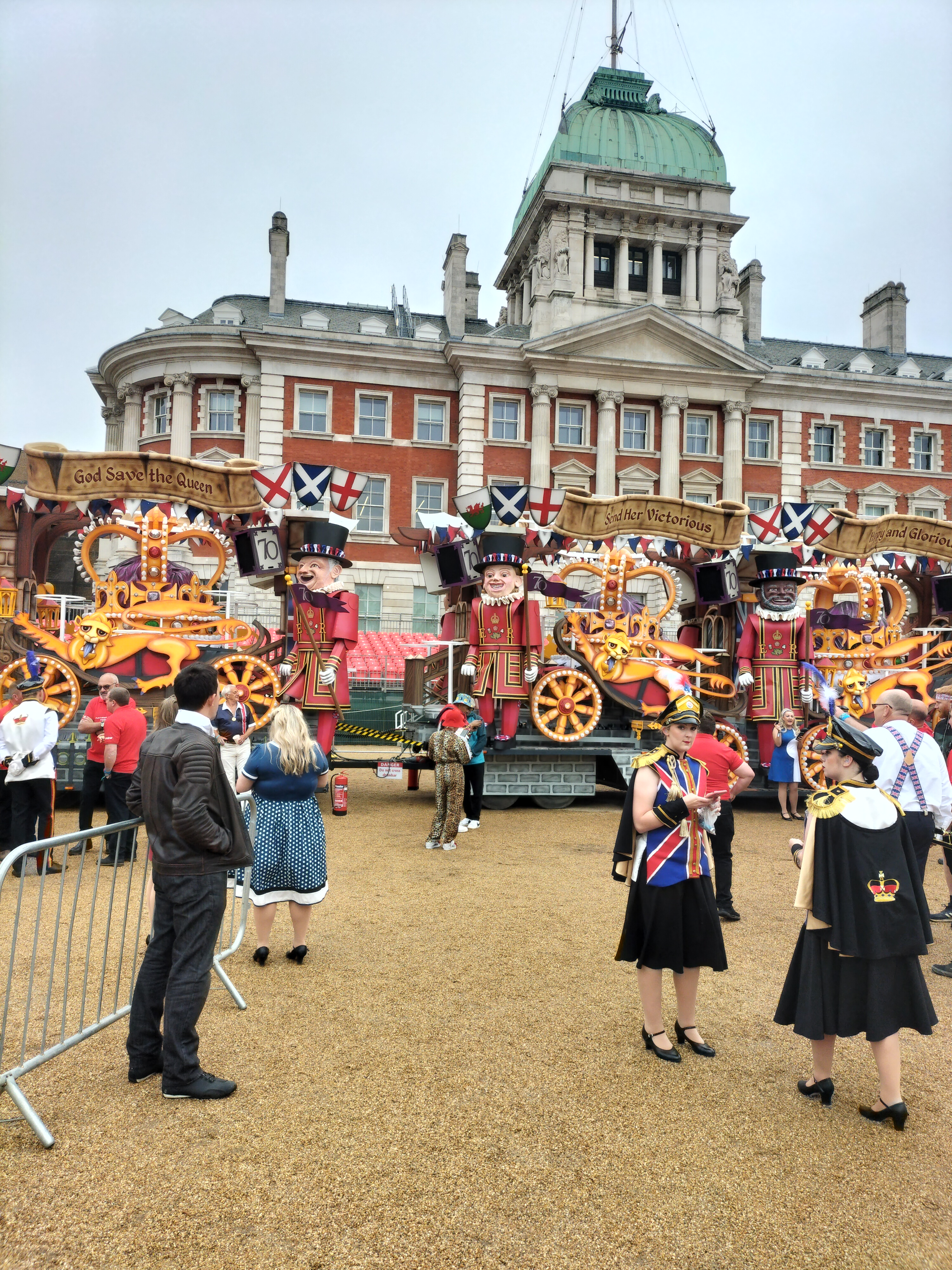

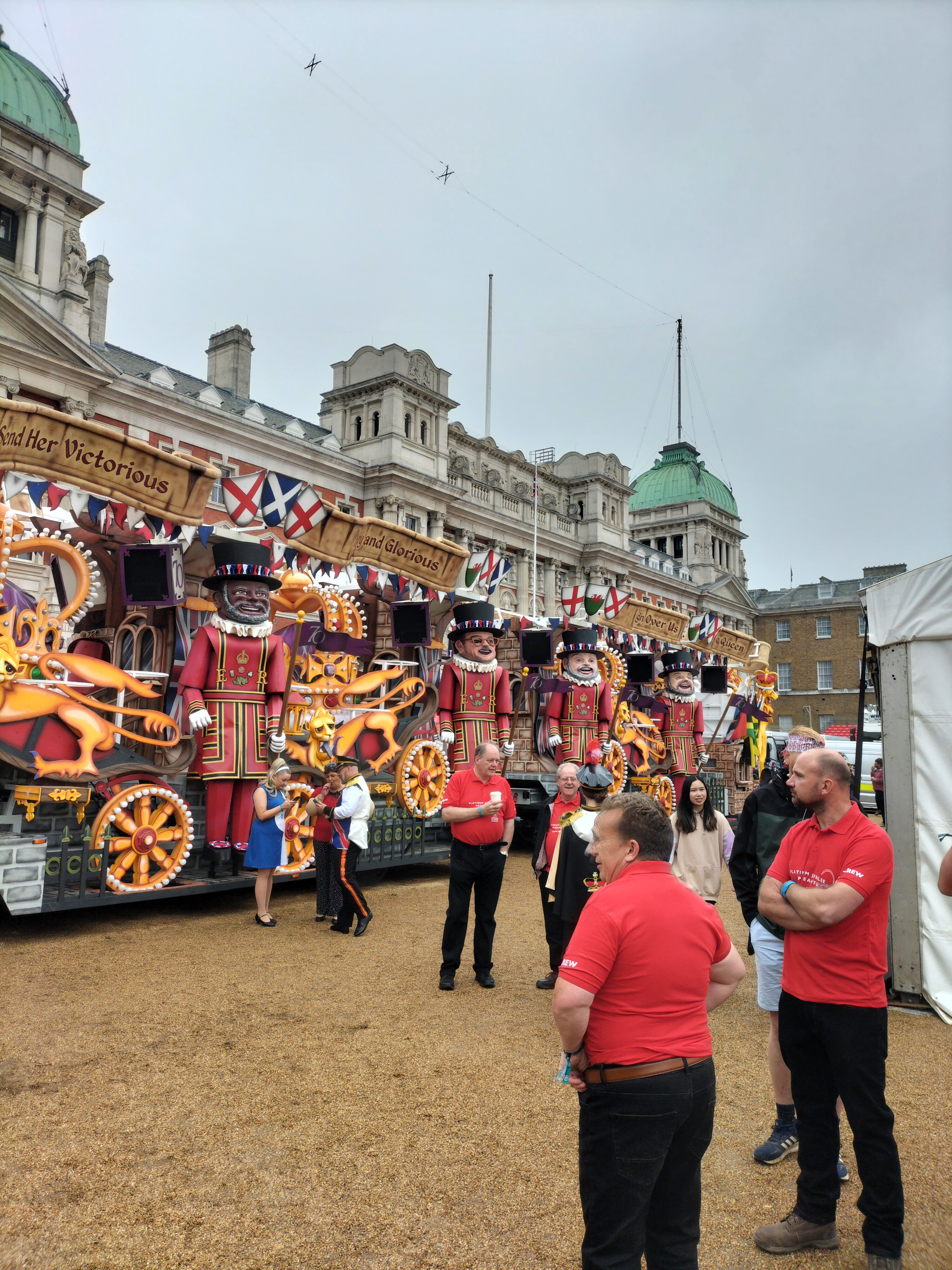

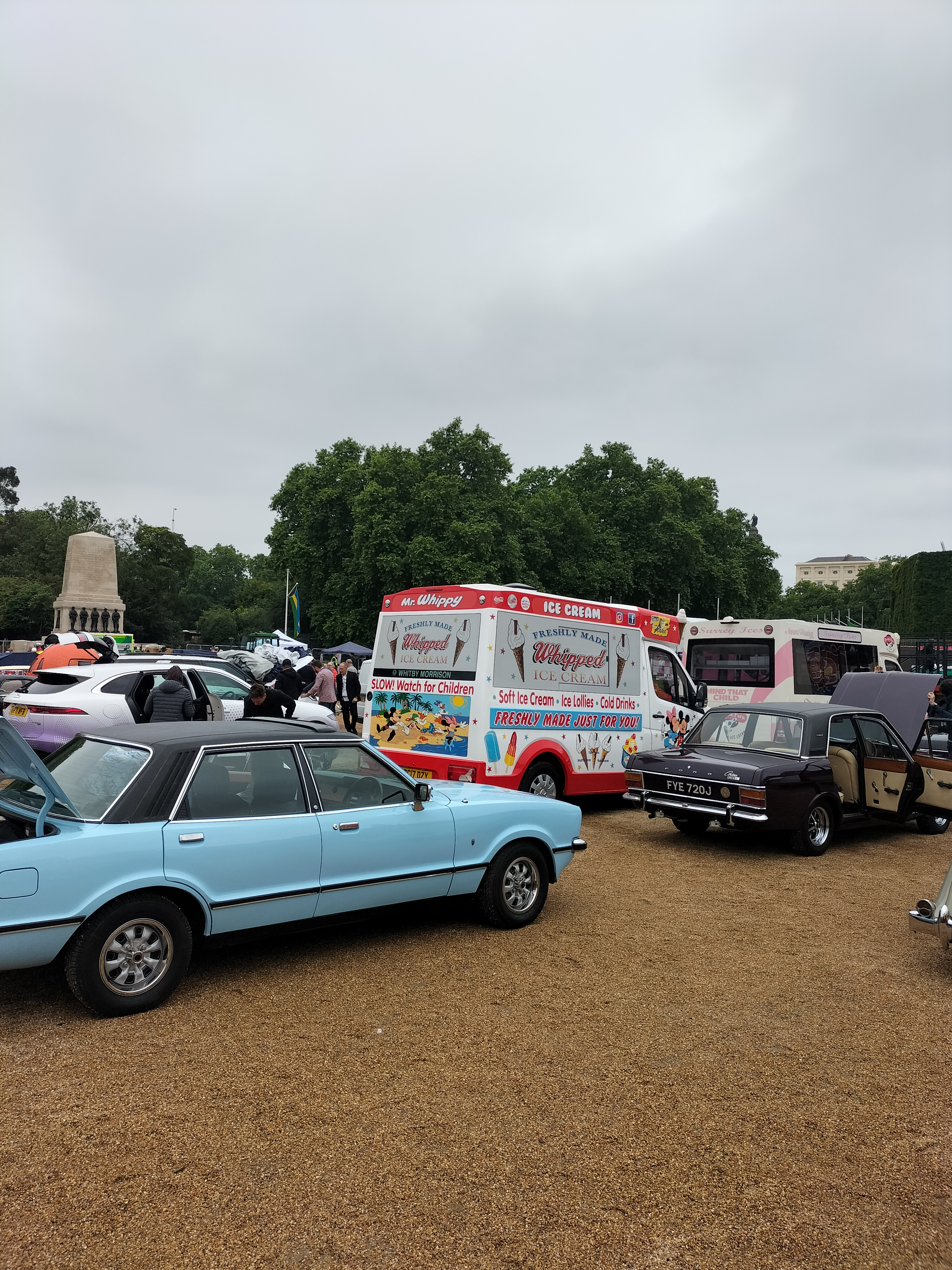

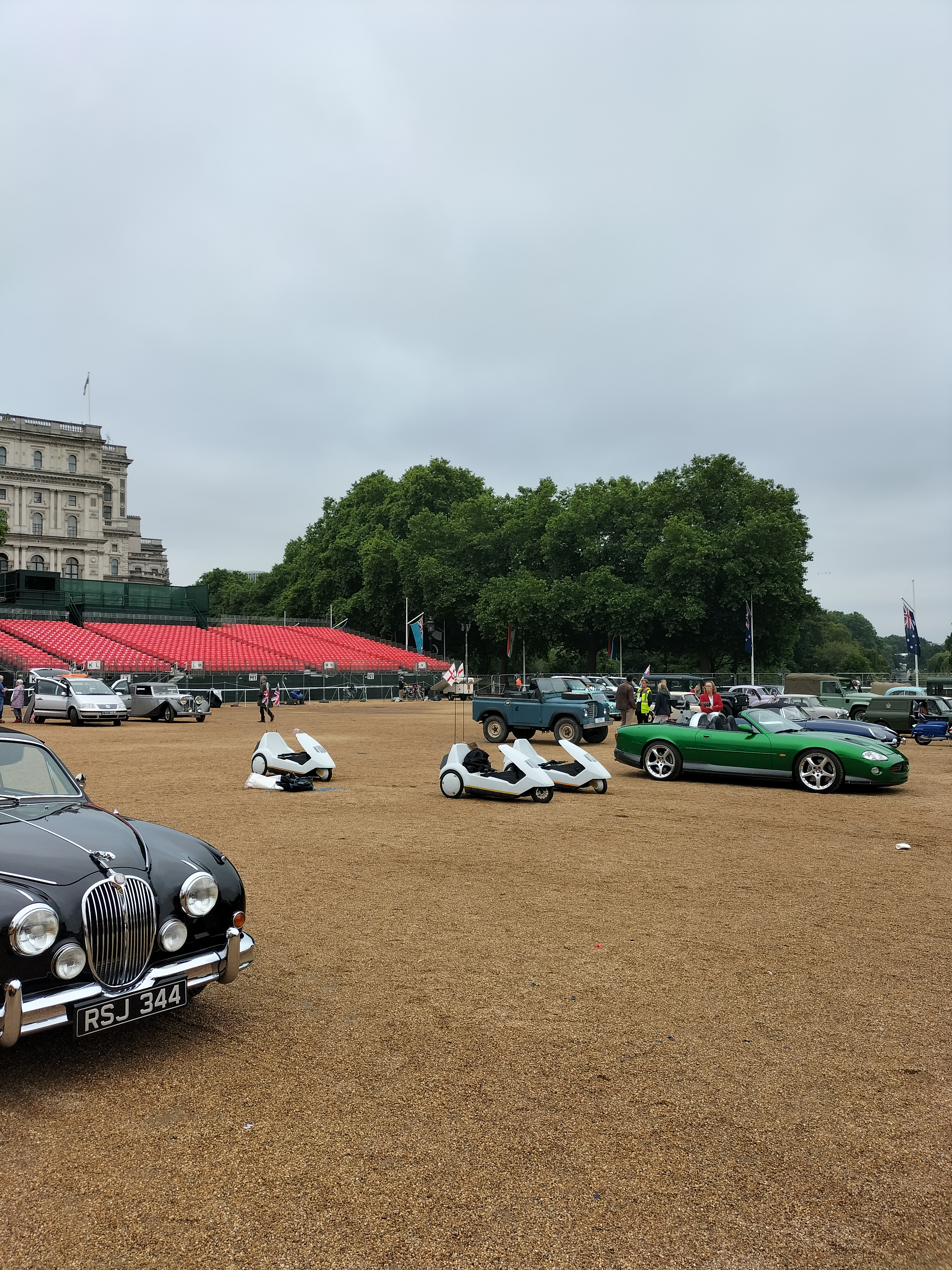

== The Pageant Route ==
It involved more than 10,000 people and covered a 3km route, similar in length to the path taken by the Queen during her coronation.

All the vehicles prepared to depart Horse Guards Parade at 14:00 and would go towards Whitehall, where dancers would merge in pre designated areas in front of the buses in the era they represented. They then proceeded through Admiralty Arch and down the Mall; then past the specially erected Royal Box at Constitutional Hill and past Buckingham Palace. It would then proceed along Spur Road and then up Birdcage Walk. Finally then through Horse Guards Road and back to Horse Guards Parade. The route took 1.5 hours to complete.

== The pageant ==
The pageant featured four acts:

=== Act 1: For Queen and Country ===
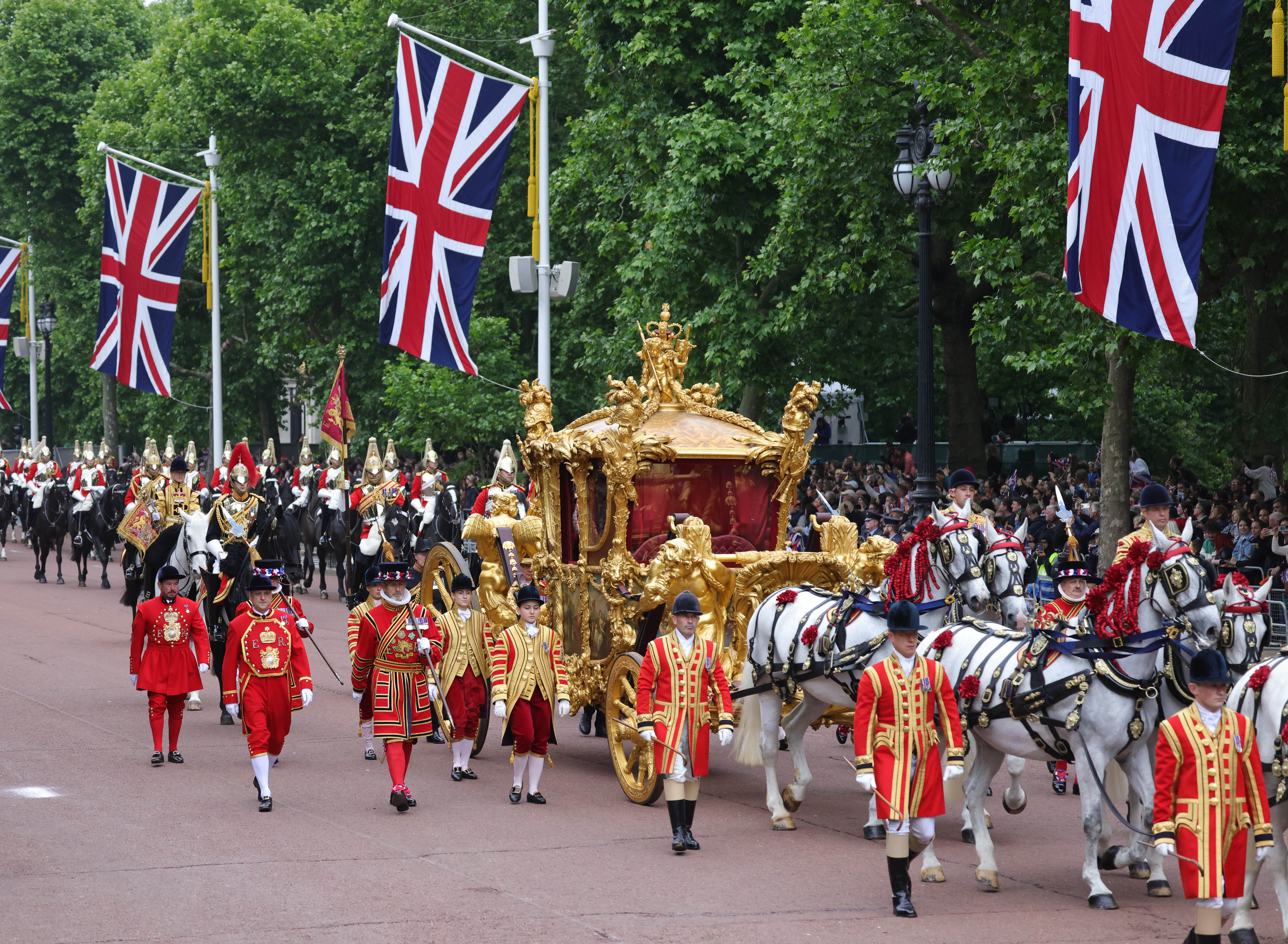

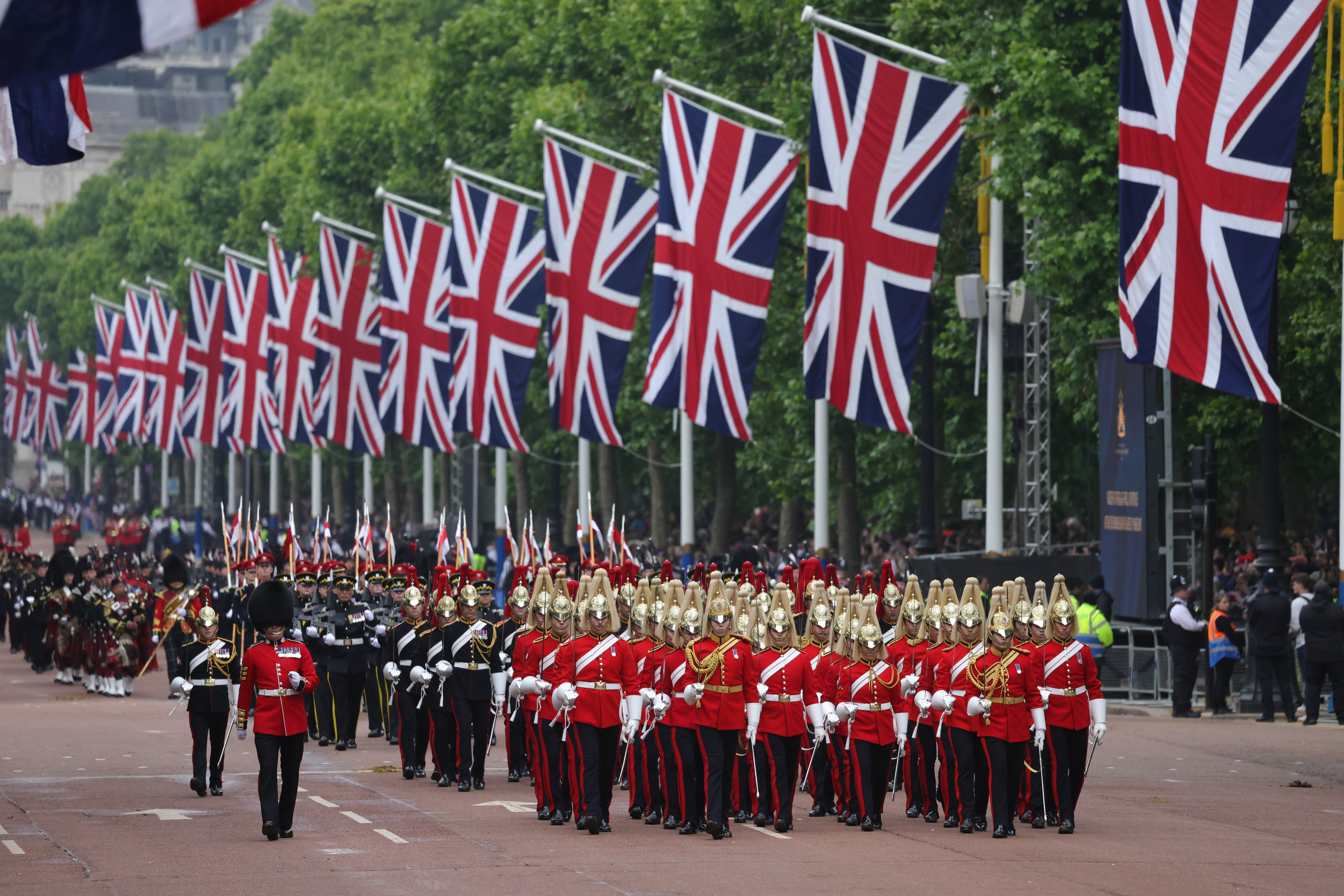

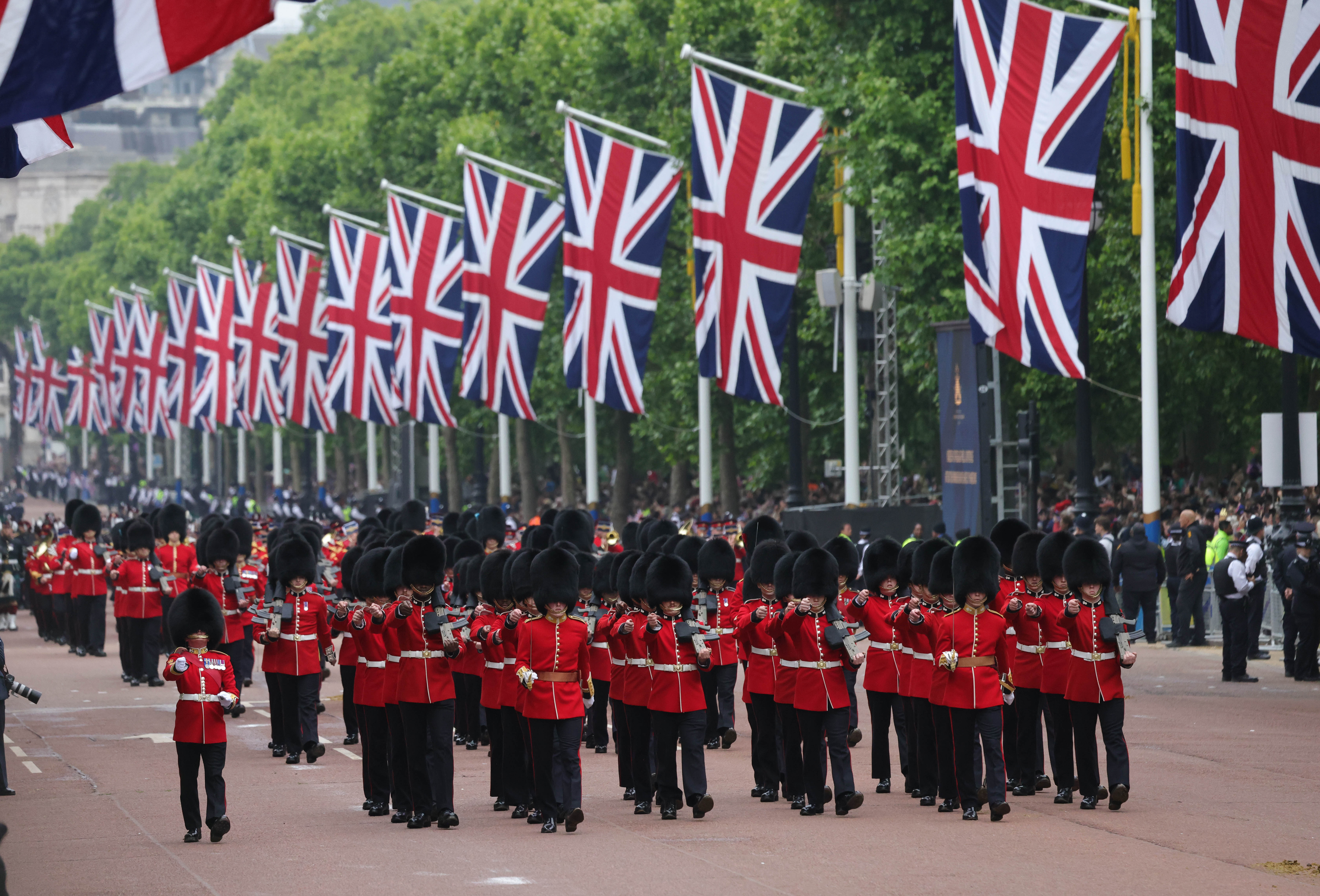

The first act, For Queen and Country, was composed of a military parade with 1,750 people and 200 horses. To mark the beginning of the pageant, the bells of Westminster Abbey pealed as they did on the Queen's Coronation Day in 1953. The Mounted Band of the Household Cavalry led the Gold State Coach, pulled by eight Windsor Grey horses. The coach windows showed original footage recorded on Coronation Day. Many units of the British Armed Forces and representatives of the armed services of the Commonwealth of Nations participated:

- Her Majesty's Naval Service
  - Royal Navy (sailors from HMS Queen Elizabeth and HMS Lancaster)
  - Royal Marines
  - Band of HM Royal Marines CTCRM
  - Band of HM Royal Marines Collingwood
- British Army
  - Life Guards
  - Blues and Royals
  - Foot Guards and their respective regimental bands
  - Royal Scots Dragoon Guards and Pipes and Drums of the Royal Scots Dragoon Guards
  - Royal Lancers
  - Royal Tank Regiment
  - Royal Artillery
  - Queen's Gurkha Engineers
  - Royal Regiment of Scotland
  - Duke of Lancaster's Regiment
  - 1st Battalion, The Royal Welsh
  - Royal Irish Regiment
  - Adjutant General's Corps
  - British Army Band Sandhurst
  - British Army Band Colchester
  - Honourable Artillery Company
- Royal Air Force
  - RAF Regiment
  - RAF Marham
  - Central Band of the Royal Air Force
- Commonwealth of Nations contingent
  - Colour Party provided by No.7 Company, Coldstream Guards
  - Representatives from 21 countries:
    - Australia (Federation Guard)
    - The Bahamas
    - Bahrain Defence Force, Royal Guard Cavalry
    - Bangladesh
    - Barbados
    - Belize
    - Canada
    - Fiji
    - Guyana
    - Jamaica (Jamaica Regiment)
    - Lesotho
    - Malaysia (Royal Malay Regiment)
    - Maldives
    - Namibia
    - New Zealand, including a Māori war party or taua
    - Pakistan (President's Bodyguard)
    - Papua New Guinea (Royal Pacific Islands Regiment)
    - Seychelles
    - Sri Lanka
    - Tanzania
    - Tonga
    - Uganda

=== Act 2: The Time of Our Lives ===
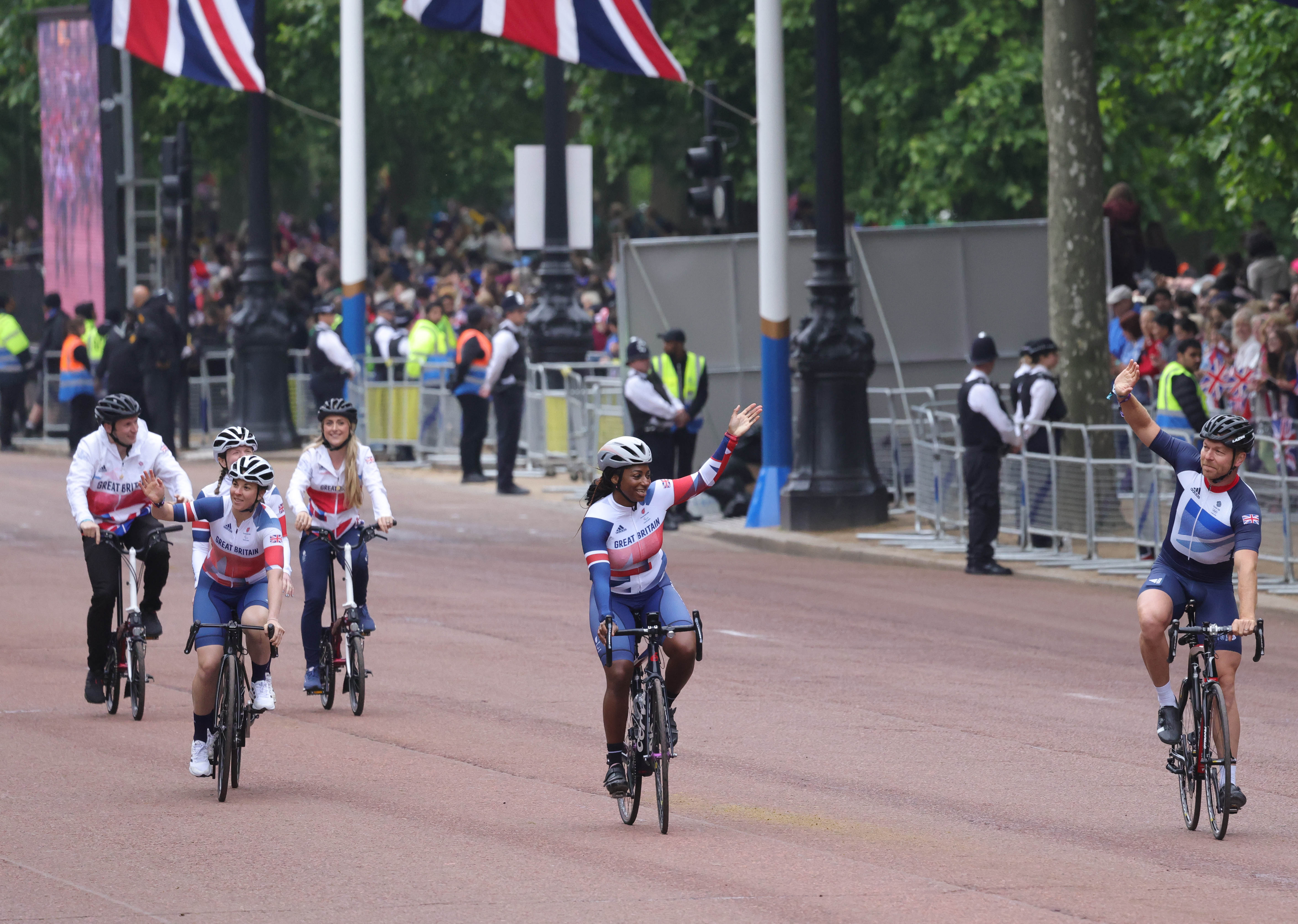

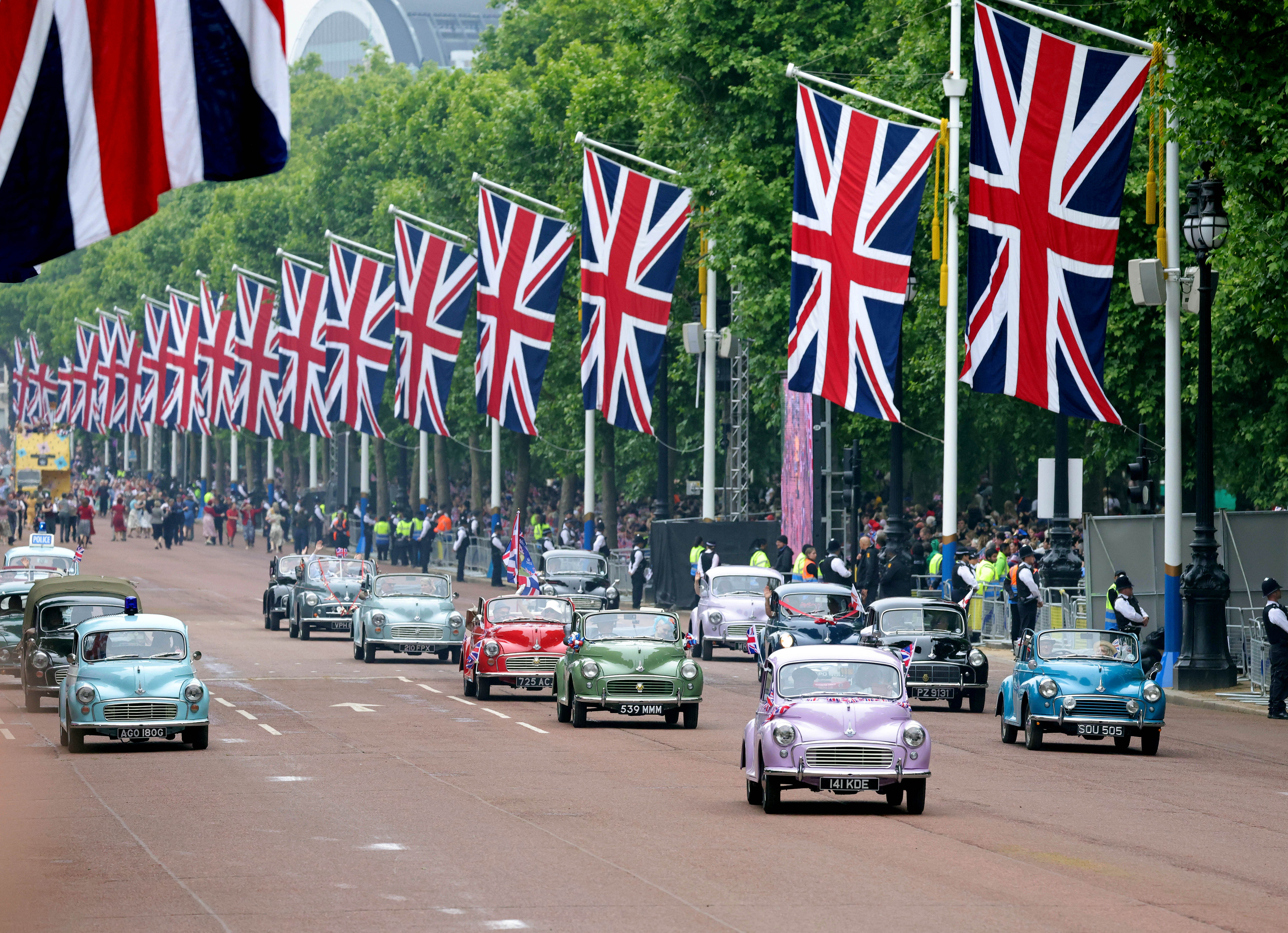

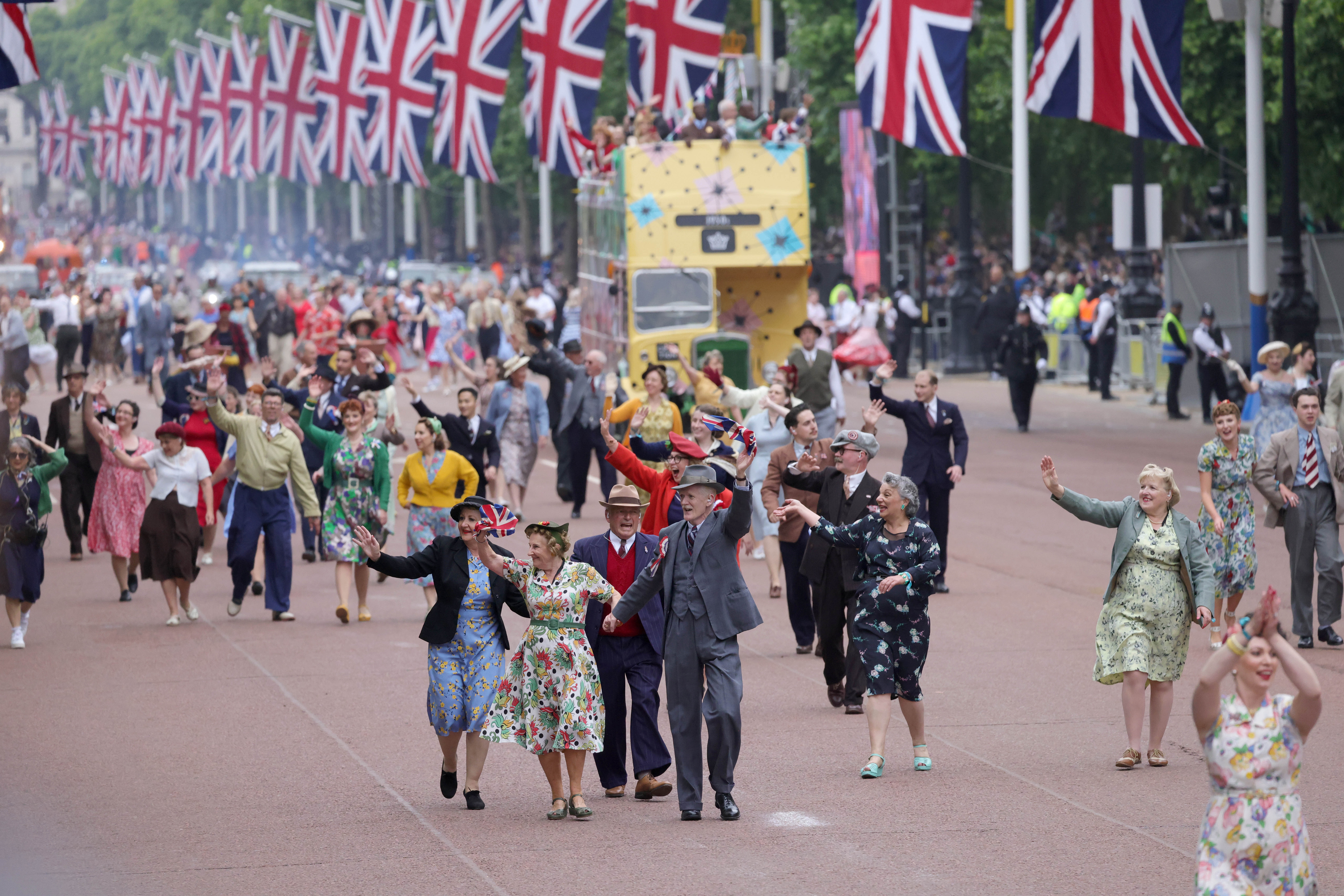

The second act, The Time of Our Lives, showcased changes in culture, technology, music and fashion throughout the past seven decades from 1952 to 2022. Open-top double-decker buses were used to represent different decades of the Queen's reign, with TV personalities, musicians, chefs, sportspeople, designers, and artists taking part in the procession. Onboard the 1950s bus were Katherine Jenkins, Chris Eubank and Sir Cliff Richard, while the 1960s bus was followed by 4 Daleks from the BBC series Dr Who, and included figures such as Anthea Turner and Basil Brush. The 1990s were represented by Erin O'Connor, Kate Moss, Charlotte Tilbury, Patsy Kensit and Naomi Campbell. Chris McCausland, Sir Mo Farah, Sally Gunnell, Dame Kelly Holmes and Gok Wan appeared on the 2000s bus. Another bus featured children's TV and video game characters, including the Teletubbies, Peter Rabbit and Pac-Man. Additionally, 300 cyclists were led by the Olympic gold medallist Sir Chris Hoy, and a collection of vintage cars and James Bond cars were paraded across The Mall.

=== Act 3: Let's Celebrate ===
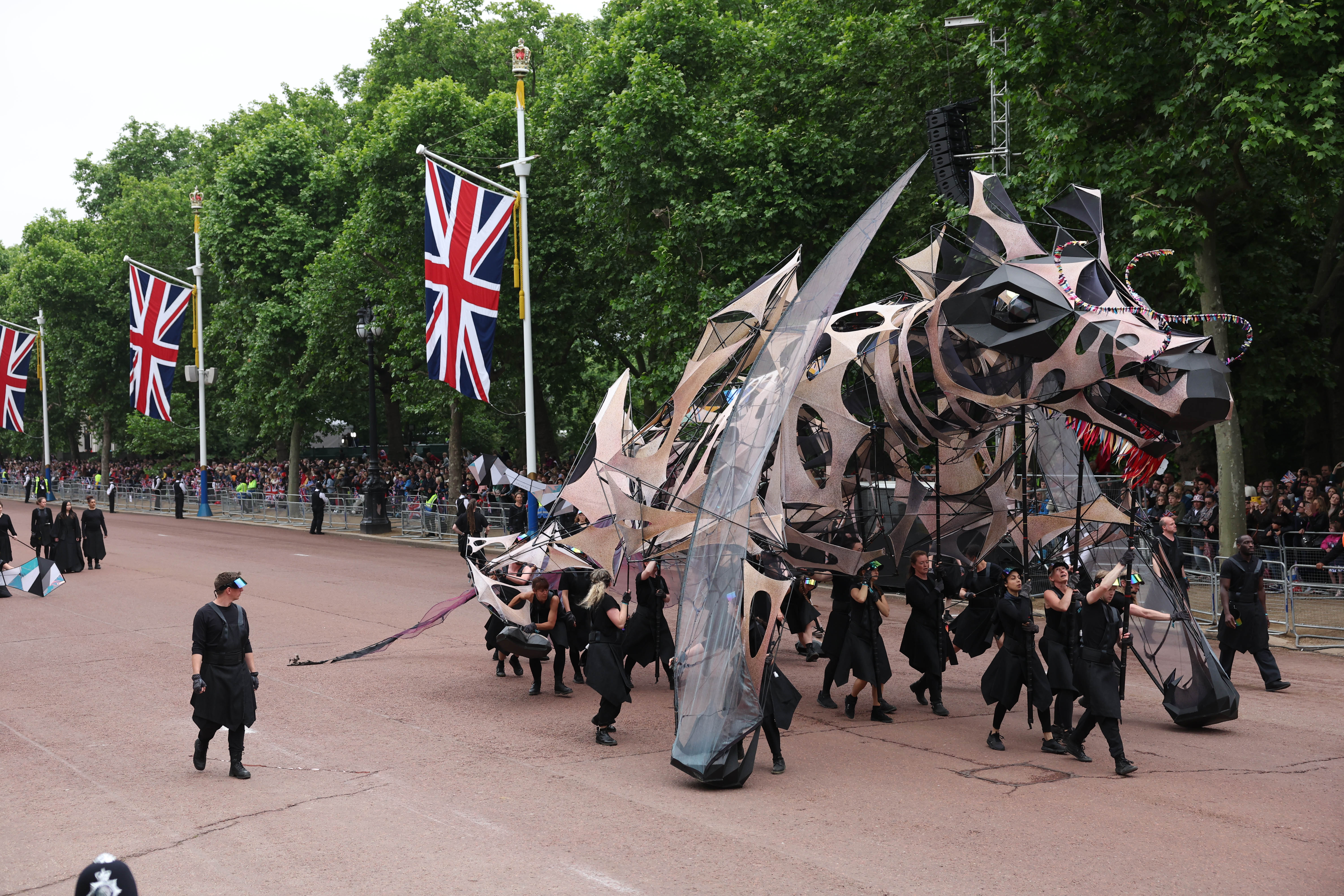

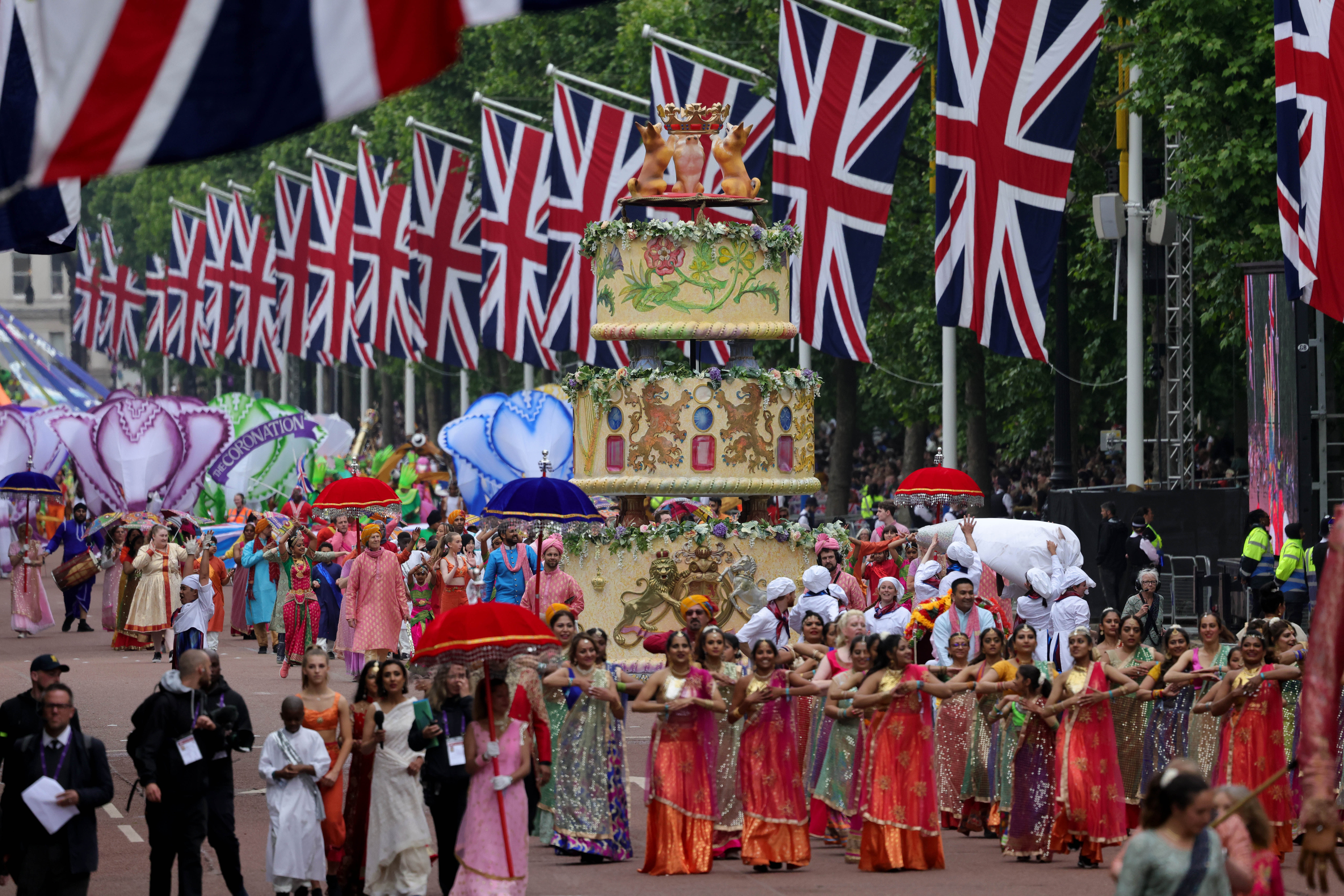

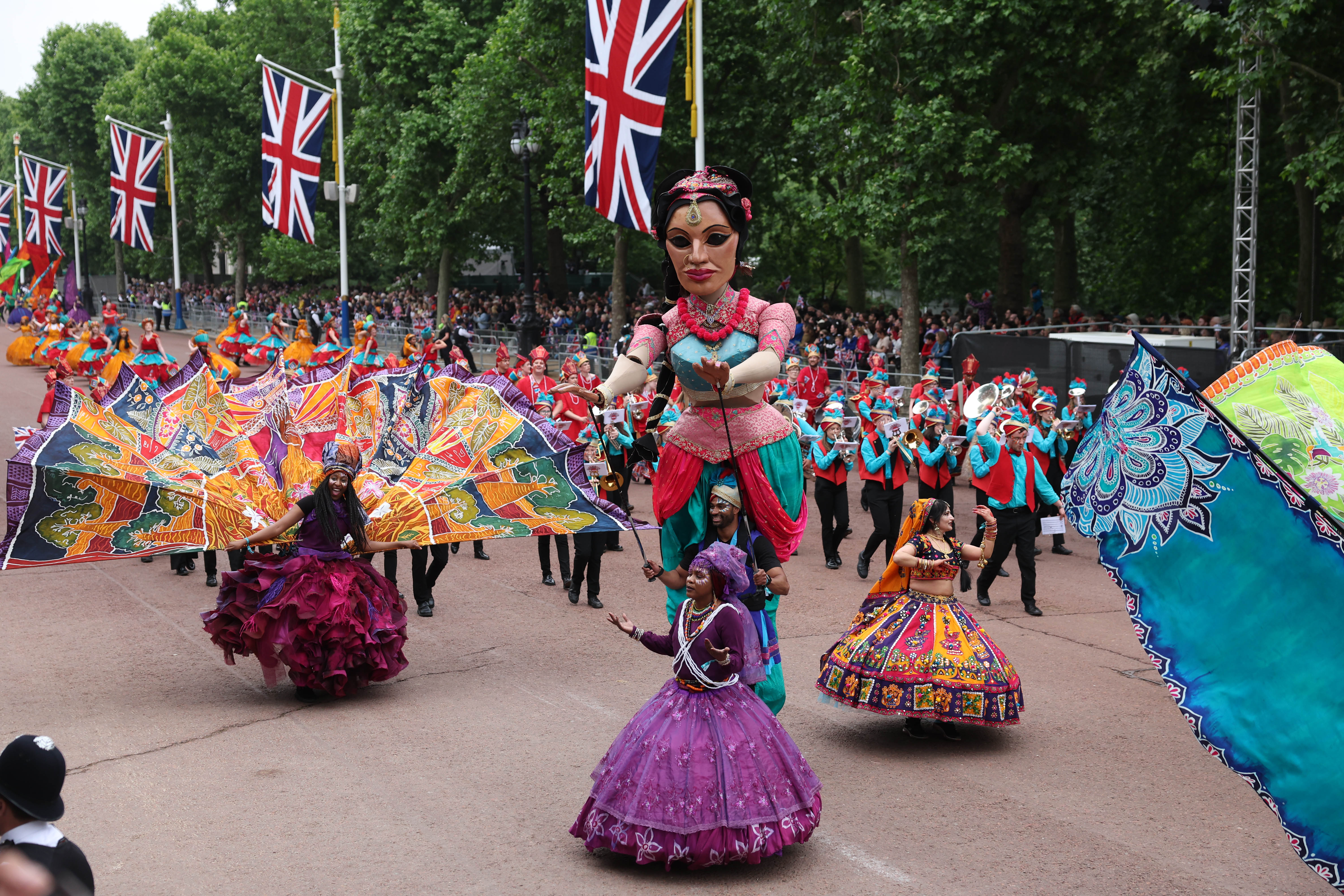

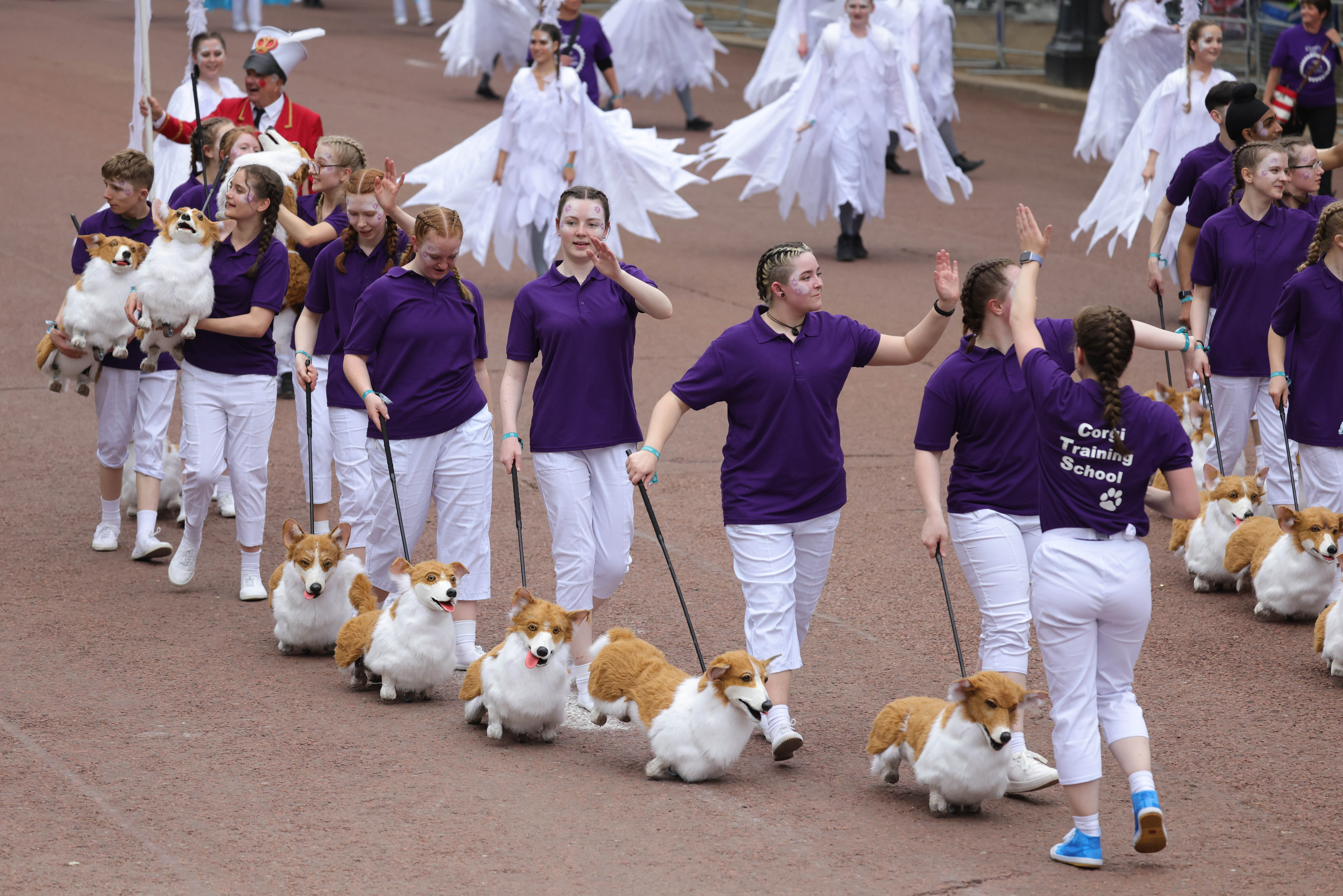

The third act, Let's Celebrate, was composed of carnival floats and featured street theatre acts and urban dance from various performer groups. Highlights from the act included a dancer interacting with The Hatchling, a 21 feet (6.4 m) dragon puppet, depictions of the Queen's Beasts that were also a part of her coronation, Asian/Bollywood wedding dances, the coronation scenes recreated with an Afro-Caribbean style, a mighty oak and maypole whose ribbons formed a picture of the Queen, depiction of past jubilees and royal weddings via dance, paper and with butterflies representing different faiths, the River of Hope flags featuring artworks by children, jazz music and sousaphones, a 20 feet (6.1 m) puppet of Godiva, and a mobile circus.

=== Act 4: Happy and Glorious ===
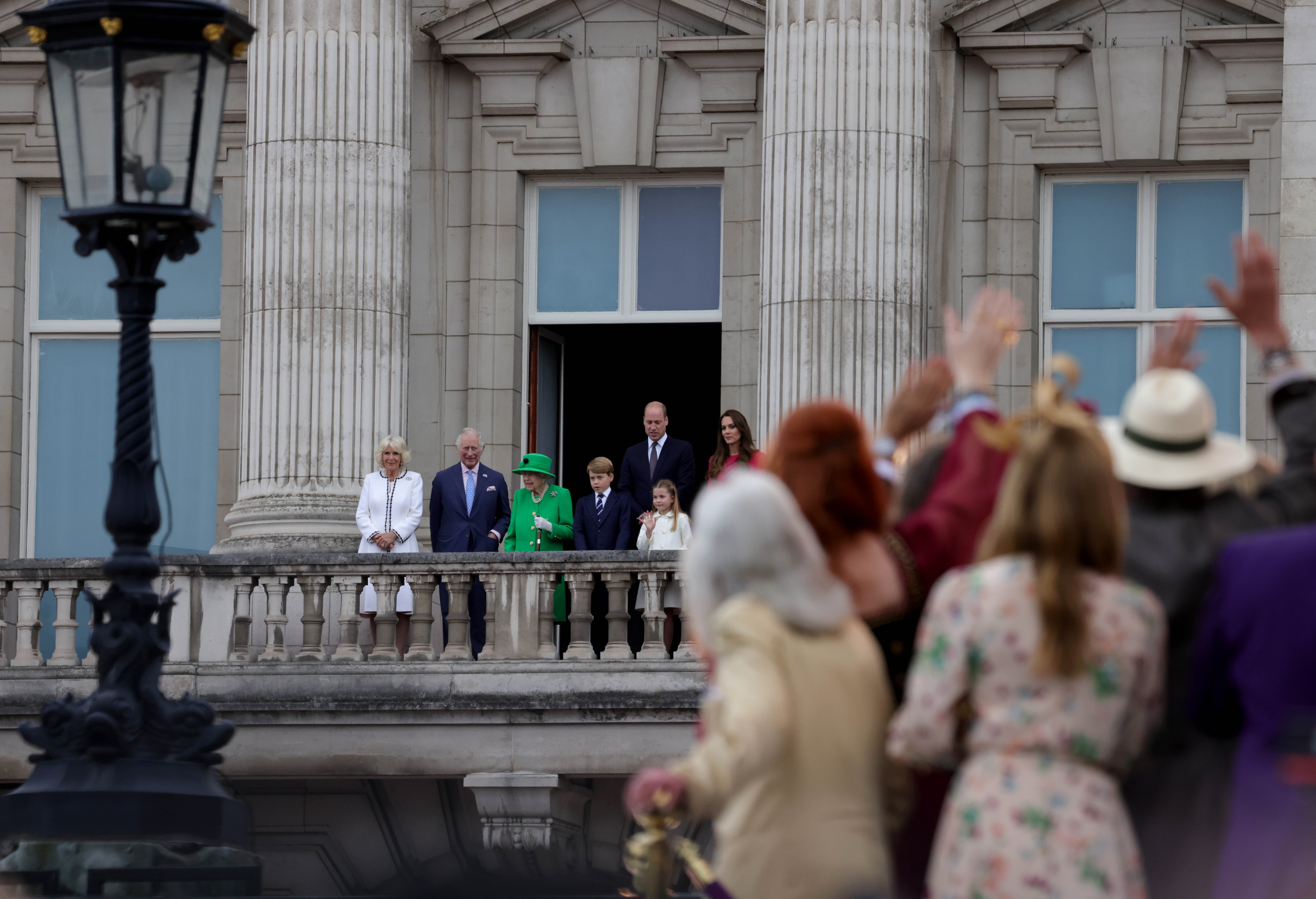
The Queen and members of the royal family on the balcony of Buckingham Palace

The fourth act, Happy and Glorious, featured a performance of "Perfect" by Ed Sheeran as a tribute to the Queen and the Duke of Edinburgh. Crowds gathered at the Victoria Memorial towards the end of the ceremony. The Queen, accompanied by the Prince of Wales, the Duchess of Cornwall, the Duke and Duchess of Cambridge, and Prince George, Princess Charlotte, and Prince Louis, appeared on the balcony of the Buckingham Palace for the finale of the pageant, and everyone sang the national anthem "God Save the Queen" led by the London Community Gospel Choir and the Band of Her Majesty's Royal Marines. A flypast by the Red Arrows was cancelled due to bad weather. As the Royal Family left the balcony, the West End cast of Mamma Mia! performed "Dancing Queen". The Queen later thanked everyone for their "good wishes" in a statement.

== See also ==
- Diamond Jubilee Pageant
- Thames Diamond Jubilee Pageant
