= Taua =

Māori war party

A taua is a war party in the tradition of the Māori, the indigenous people of New Zealand. Contemporary knowledge of taua is gleaned from missionary observations and writings during the Musket Wars of the early 19th century and the later New Zealand wars. The reason to gather a taua may be for reasons of seeking revenge (utu) or seeking compensation for an offence against an individual, community or society (blood revenge).

== Composition ==
A taua was typically composed of males, although there were occasions when women fought as well. The party was led by a chief (rangatira), and would be made up of around 70 warriors. This number was the general capacity of a “waka taua” (a war canoe), however sometimes waka would be designed to carry up to 140 warriors, and such canoes were called "Te Hokwhitu a Tu". During the height of the Musket Wars the number of warriors rose to about 2,000 and the group travelled mainly on foot around the North Island coast.

The most comprehensive written account of a war expedition was written by missionary Henry Williams. This heke was a consequence of the so-called Girls’ War, which was a fight that occurred on the beach at Kororāreka, Bay of Islands in March 1830 between northern and southern hapū within the Ngāpuhi iwi. Hengi, a chief of Whangaroa, was shot and killed while he attempted to stop the fighting. The duty of seeking revenge had passed to Mango and Kakaha, the sons of Hengi; they took the view that the death of their father should be acknowledged through a muru (war expedition to honour the death of an important chief), against tribes to the south.

Mango, Kakaha and Tītore (a war leader of the Ngāpuhi) did not commence the muru until January 1832. The warriors were successful in fights on the Mercury Islands and Tauranga, with the muru continuing until late July 1832. In February 1833 Tītore consulted the Tohunga, Tohitapu to foresee the success of a second war expedition; then Tītore led a party of Te Rarawa, allies of the Ngāpuhi, back to Tauranga. Williams also accompanied the second expedition.

== Muru ==
Muru is the negative or revenge side of the Māori cultural practice of utu, carried out by taua, which can be either positive or negative. It was within Māori traditions for a taua to conduct muru against hapu who had no involvement in the events that caused the death of the chief. Often muru was preceded by a tribal or hapu discussion as to what action should take place. Normally muru was an act by taua to balance an act of violence or theft. In the early days of European settlers muru was practiced against settlers who had transgressed against Māori lore. Often settlers were bewildered by apparent random thefts or acts of violence. Sometimes, especially in the north, chiefs would intercede to give a cultural explanation to settlers and arrange a suitable payment of goods in compensation. In Māori society it was accepted that muru could be carried out against strangers. This had the appearance of arbitrary attacks on innocent parties. This led to a direct conflict with colonial law where only the guilty could be punished. In 1847 in Whanganui a Māori chief was accidentally shot in the face on a ship. He accepted that his wound was an accident. His wound was tended to by a doctor and the man recovered but a taua decided to take muru for the accident by attacking a local farmer /artist. He escaped, but the taua killed four members of the family and wounded two more. When five of the taua were caught by Māori the taua were found to be 14 and 19 year olds. All, apart from the 14 year old were found guilty of murder and hanged. The 14 year old was banished.

== Strategy ==
Taua would typically restrict their activity to the fighting season, between late November and early April, when food and fishing was plentiful. During the height of the musket wars Taua were away from their turangawaiwai for up to a year. By 1830 they were no longer dependent on traditional crops such as kūmara which only grew well in the north most part of North Island, the Iwi now grew large quantities of more easily grown potatoes.

The taua would usually attack at dawn in the form of an ambush or a surprise raid. Their intimate knowledge of New Zealand's natural environment enabled them to appear and disappear swiftly and noiselessly and successfully complete their mission. As Maori at the time were strongly committed to the idea of "utu" (revenge), the aim would be to kill all members of the enemy war party and leave no survivors. There were, however, occasions when warring taua would come to a truce. This would be typically settled through the arrangement of an intertribal marriage.

== Customs ==
The haka was a central feature to the life and culture of each taua. Other customs and rites included abstinence of certain foods and practices, dedication to Tūmatauenga, the god of war, and rites that would place a "tapu" around the warrior, and lift the tapu when the warrior returned home. It was customary to eat the vanquished or to take slaves, which could be eaten later or used as slave labour. Heads of defeated chiefs were kept as trophies and displayed on palisades of the home pā or defensive settlement.

== Taua film ==
Taua (aka War Party) is a 2007 short film written and directed by Te Arepa Kahi.
