= Muru (surname) =

Family name

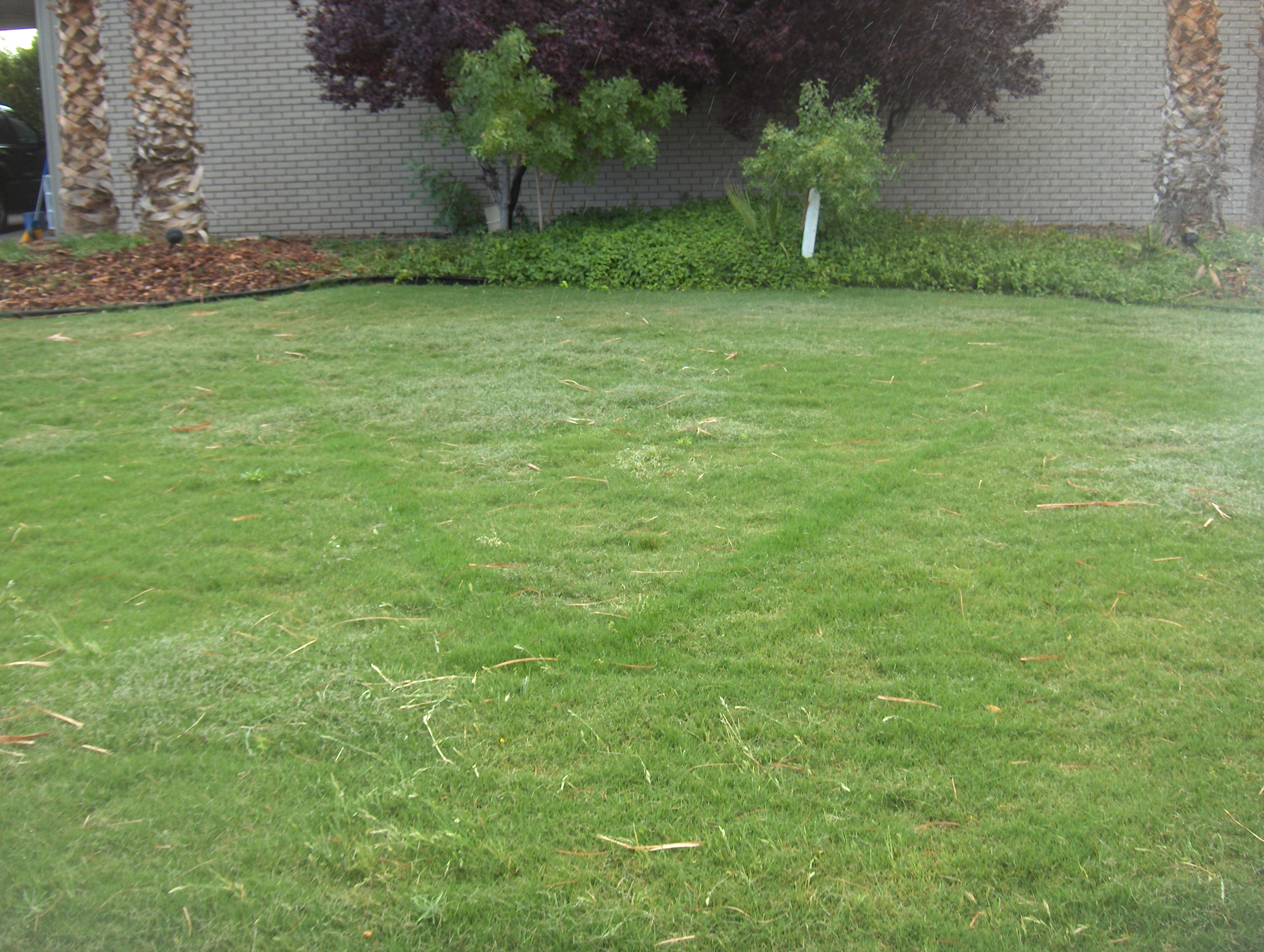

Origin
- Language: Estonian
- Meaning: "lawn"
- Region of origin: Estonia

Muru is an Estonian surname meaning "lawn". As of 1 January 2022, 170 men and 177 women in Estonia have the surname Muru. Muru is ranked as the 385th most common surname for men in Estonia, and the 403rd most common surname for Estonian women. The surname Muru is the most common in Järva County, where 6.41 per 10,000 inhabitants of the county bear the surname. Notable people bearing the surname Muru include:

- Kalev Muru (born 1954), mountaineer
- Karl Muru (1927–2017), literary scholar and literary critic
- Urmas Muru (born 1961), architect and artist
