= Muru (Māori concept) =

Māori custom

Muru is a concept in Māori culture, describing acts of compensation for wrongdoing, either between hapū (sub-tribes), whānau (extended families) or individuals. A form of utu, muru is a process of restorative justice to restore balance in relationships and society. Often muru involves the transfer of goods or resources in response to an offense. In the early colonial era of New Zealand, muru was recognised as a legal concept in colonial New Zealand courts, as an equivalent to common law damages.

== Concept ==
Muru is an act performed by a party, which is a public accusation and denouncement of a transgressor, which could be for acts such as theft, infidelity, or a violation of tapu. Muru could occur for both intentional and unintentional acts, and was often used as a response to accidents. While muru is a form of utu, it differs from utu, as when the muru process has been completed, this signifies a resolution and a return to the natural balance of society. No further compensation is needed from the party who undertook the wrongdoing, and this party accepts the blame for the offences they caused. The main concern of muru was to punish and denounce a group or individual, and the rehabilitation of both parties.

Traditionally, muru typically occurred between related hapū (sub-tribes) and whānau (extended families) groups, and the accused party was usually a collective; even if the act was undertaken by an individual, the person's whānau or hapū would be affecte by their actions.

Mana influenced the muru process. If either the aggravator or aggrieved party had great mana or a high social standing, a larger taua (party of people) would be sent to undertake the process. This meant that to many, being accused of an offence through muru with a large taua was a great honour, as it acknowledged the mana and high standing of the accused party. Other factors which would influence the nature of muru (i.e. what sort of compensation was necessary) included the severity of the offense, and the intent of the transgressing party.

Muru traditionally had a set process known as whakawā, which involved a formal dialogue of accusation and investigation similar to a modern court trial. The whakawā process could also include waiata (song) and shared meals.

Compensation was typically made through the forfeit of assets, such as taonga (prized possessions) and resources, but could include land rights and physical punishments. If land rights were a part of the compensation process, the land is referred to as whenua muru. Physical punishments were often stylised, with a limited scope for what kinds of weapons and injuries were allowed. If balance was not restored through the muru process, a taua (hostile party) was sometimes necessary. A taua muru was an expedition where assets were taken without violence, while a taua ngaki mate or taua roto were parties that sought violent revenge to restore balance. Ultimately, the muru process was intended as a way to avoid warfare.

Early Pākehā writers during the colonial era of New Zealand typically described muru negatively, often as a form of plunder.

== Muru in legislation ==
The custom of muru was first recognised by the colonial New Zealand government in the 1844 Native Exemption Ordinance. Due to this, legal cases involving Māori could involve asset forteiture or monetary compensation, in lieu of other forms of punishment. Muru was originally only applied in cases involving theft; however, after an amendment to the Fines for Assault Ordinance 1845, this was extended to include assault cases as well. The custom was reaffirmed in the Resident Magistrates Act 1867, but removed in 1893, when bicultural applications of the law were abolished.
