= David Zolkwer =

British event producer and director

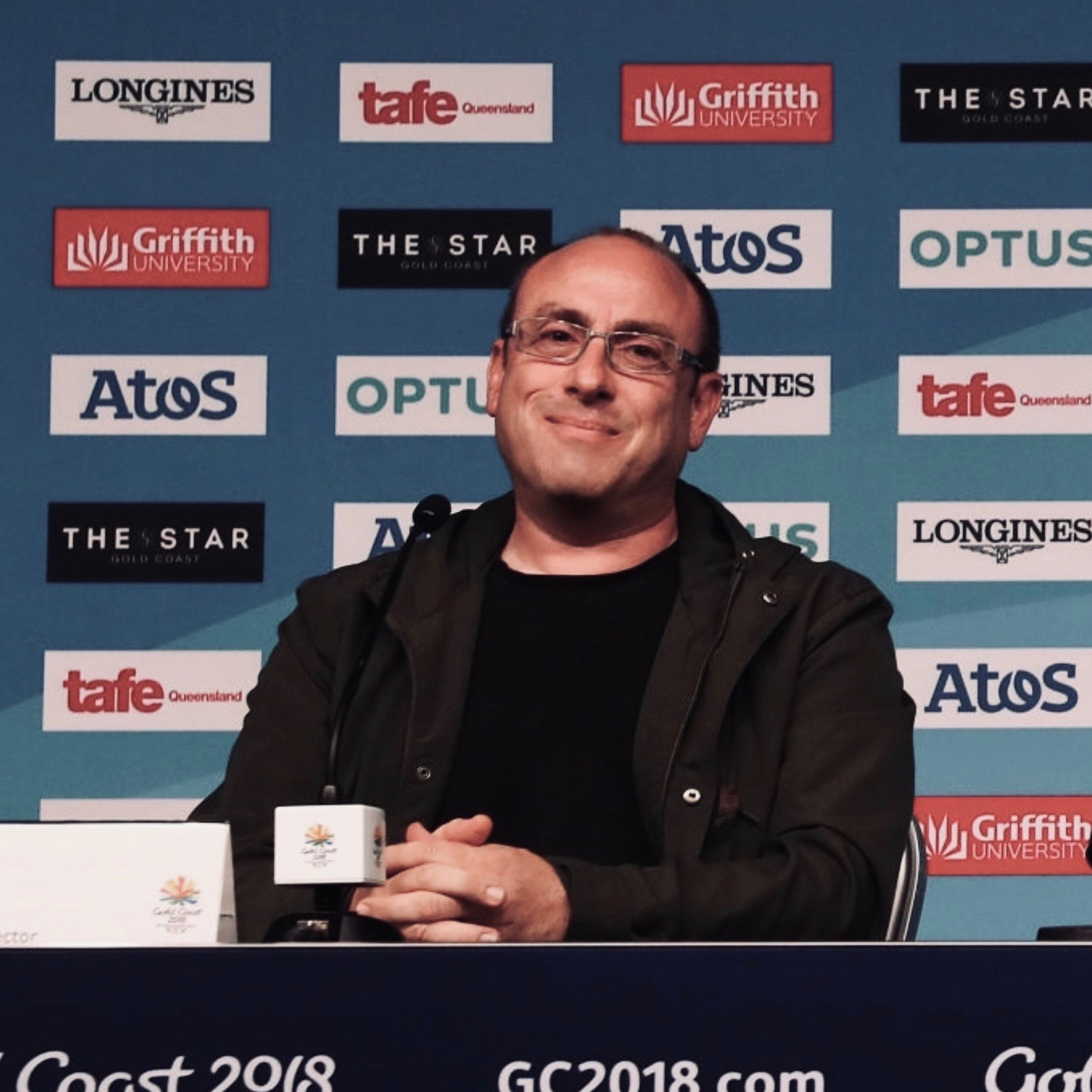
Zolkwer speaking at a press conference the day after the opening ceremony of the Gold Coast 2018 Commonwealth Games.

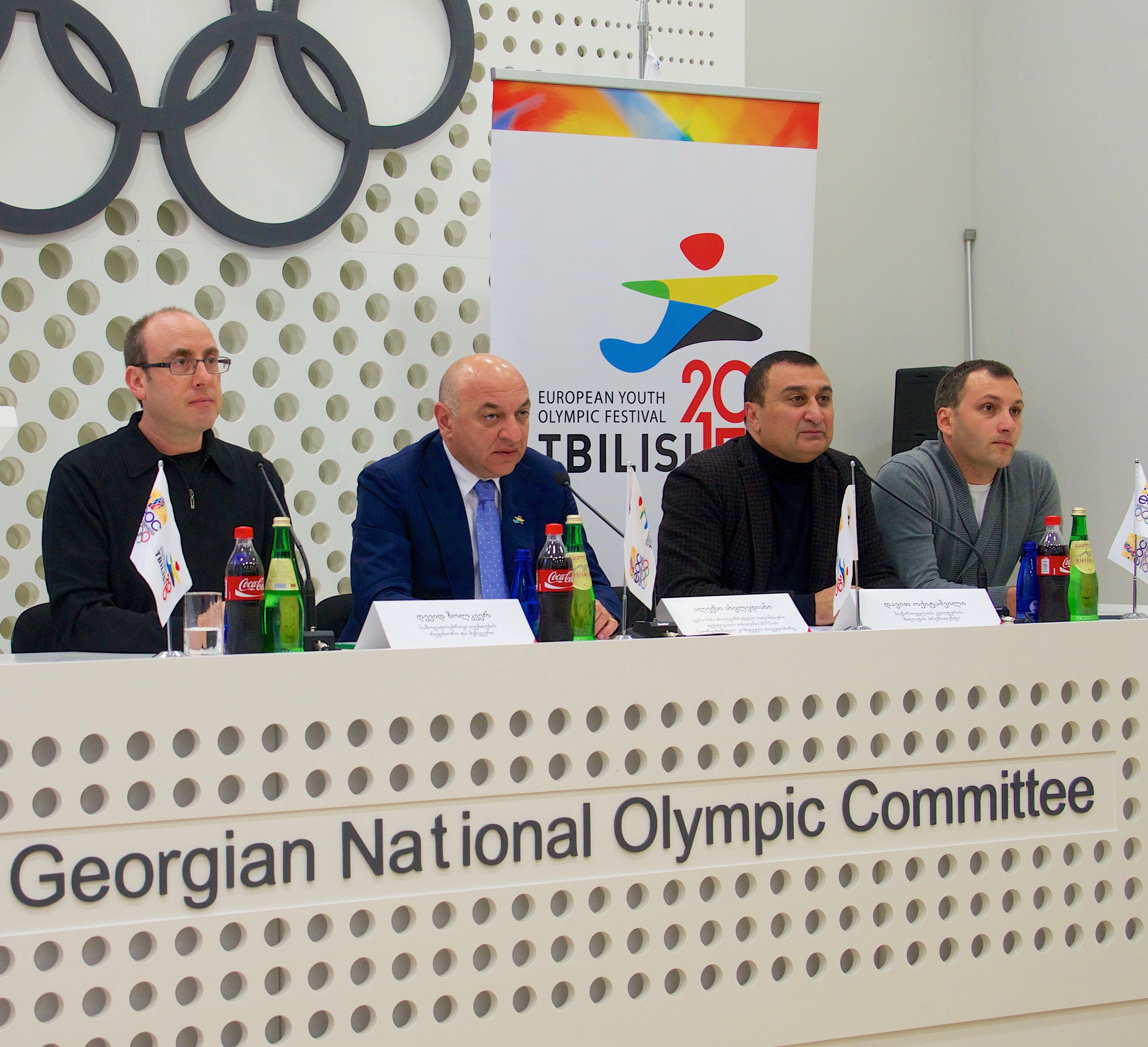
David Zolkwer (left) speaking at a press conference ahead of the Georgia 2015 European Youth Olympic Festival.

David Zolkwer MVO (born April 1963) is a British director and producer known for large-scale public ceremonies, including four Commonwealth Games opening and closing ceremonies and Queen Elizabeth II's Platinum Jubilee Pageant.

== Early career ==
Zolkwer trained at theatres in Manchester before moving to London to study at the Guildhall School of Music and Drama and then Middlesex University. He worked in London fringe theatre before moving into the experiential marketing and events industry, spending 15 years at Jack Morton Worldwide as Executive Vice President and Head of Public Events, International.

== Ceremonies career ==
Zolkwer was Project Director and Creative Director for the 1997 Hong Kong Handover Ceremony and, in 2000, for the "Money" and "Self Portrait" zones at the Millennium Dome.

He was Project Director and Artistic Director for the ceremonies of the 2002 Commonwealth Games in Manchester, personally directing the Opening Ceremony.

In 2004 he was one of the lead creative directors and overall project director for the ceremonies of the 2004 Olympic Games in Athens, the only non-Greek member of the core creative team led by Dimitris Papaioannou.

Over 2007-08 he led a Jack Morton Worldwide team providing production consultancy to the Beijing Organizing Committee for the Olympic Games ahead of the 2008 Summer Olympics.

Zolkwer was Head of Ceremonies and Artistic Director for the 2014 Commonwealth Games in Glasgow, leading the Jack Morton Worldwide team that created and produced the opening and closing ceremonies.

He was Project Director and Artistic Director for the ceremonies of the 2018 Commonwealth Games on the Gold Coast, having by then also worked on the Athens 2004 and Beijing 2008 Olympic Games. Reaction to the ceremony was positive in Australian and international press coverage. Gold Coast 2018 made him the only person to have directed ceremonies for four Commonwealth Games (Manchester 2002, Glasgow 2014 and Gold Coast 2018, alongside an earlier supporting role at Melbourne 2006).

In 2022 Zolkwer directed the Platinum Jubilee Pageant, the closing event of Queen Elizabeth II's Platinum Jubilee, held in central London on 5 June 2022 and featuring more than 10,000 performers.

== Honours ==
Zolkwer was appointed Member of the Royal Victorian Order (MVO) in the 2023 New Year Honours for services to Queen Elizabeth II, King Charles III and the Platinum Jubilee Pageant.
