= Jack Morton Worldwide =

American brand experience agency

- Type: Subsidiary
- Industry: Branding agency
- Founded: 1939
- Founder: Jack Morton
- Headquarters: 33 Arch St, Ste 1400, 14th Flr; Boston, Massachusetts, United States
- Key people: Josh McCall, Chairman Emeritus; Julian Pullan, Vice Chairman; Craig Millon, CEO; Natalie Ackerman, Chief People Officer; Sharon Crichton, Chief Operating Officer; Patrick Bennett, Chief Creative Officer
- Products: Experiential/consumer engagements Digital; Marketing; Customer events/conferences Tradeshows/exhibits; Product Launches; Corporate Events; Broadcast Sets; Sponsorship Consulting
- Number of employees: 600
- Parent: Interpublic Group of Companies
- Website: www.jackmorton.com

Jack Morton Worldwide is an American multinational brand experience agency. It is a subsidiary of The Interpublic Group of Companies (IPG). The company's current chairman and CEO is Craig A Millon.

Conference & Incentive Travel Magazine ranked Jack Morton Worldwide as the number one agency based upon 2016 event-based turnover. In 2016, Event Magazine named them the top brand experience agency.

== Company history ==
Jack Morton Worldwide, as it is known today, was named after its founder, Irvin Leonidas "Jack" Morton who was born in 1910 on a tobacco and cotton farm in Newport, North Carolina. Morton eventually earned his high school diploma at the age of 22 and moved to Washington, D.C., and enrolled in The George Washington University while supported himself by working at Western Electric dispatching sound engineers to movie theaters.

While attending George Washington, Morton joined a fraternity, became a member of the interfraternity council, and soon began booking bands for fraternity dances. The bands then asked Morton to represent them in other venues in Washington. Morton printed up business cards for Jack Morton Orchestras, using the fraternity house payphone and his Western Electric office for messages.

After a short stint as a refrigerator salesman, Morton started booking bands to fraternities and sororities in Washington under the name of Jack Morton Enterprises (later changed to Jack Morton Productions). He later began booking orchestras in hotels, resorts, and night clubs in the Washington area.

=== 1940s ===
After World War II the business expanded beyond the Washington area with the opening of additional offices in New York and Chicago. Large corporations were now looking to redesign their conventions to attract and entertain customers and employees, not just to do business. The new hotels now had banquet and meeting facilities with sound systems that were ideally suited to host the conventions that trade and professional associations. During this time the modern business convention was emerging and large corporations began to see conventions as a good place to do business. American businesses would expand the scope and scale of the events they organized for their customers and employees with world class entertainment from radio and Hollywood. Jack Morton Productions produced events and trade shows for corporations like Johnson & Johnson, General Motors and industry associations like American Trucking Association using entertainers such as Lawrence Welk, Bob Hope, George Burns, Jack Benny, and Red Skelton.

=== 1950s ===
Starting in the 1950s, Jack Morton Productions expanded to produce entire conventions and promotional events in major cities around the United States. The American Trucking Association was his first big convention client and the trade group stuck with Morton for 35 years;

=== 1960s ===
In the early 1960s, William I. "Bill" Morton, the son of Jack Morton, joined the company and helped to expand the company into the area of audio-visual productions and changed the name of the company to Jack Morton Productions (JMP). It was during this time when JMP became a full-service corporate communications agency, producing entertainment programs, training programs, audio-visuals, and video conferences for a variety of corporations and trade associations.

=== 1970s ===
By 1977 Bill Morton had become chairman and CEO, with offices opened in San Francisco (1972) and Atlanta (1976). During this time, the company grew to include capabilities including planning, exhibits and environments, themed attractions and multimedia.

=== 1980s ===
Offices opened in Detroit (1987), Los Angeles (1987), Boston (1990) and Minneapolis (1990) and the company began to shift its focus from an entertainment production company to a full service creative agency.

=== 1990s ===
In April 1998, the holding company, Interpublic Group, bought Jack Morton Company for a stock transaction that according to The Wall Street Journal was likely worth more than $50 million.

=== 2000s ===
In 2000 Jack Morton acquired about 40 percent of rival Caribiner International, Inc. assets, paying $90 million for its events and communications division, which included the staging of sales meetings, events, and exhibits.

Later in 2000, Jack Morton Company renamed itself as Jack Morton Worldwide rather than take on the Caribiner name.

Bill Morton retired in 2003 after more than a quarter-century of leading the company his father founded.

In 2014, the company opened an office in Düsseldorf, Germany, to celebrate its 75th anniversary. The office was led by managing director Jens Mayer, with Microsoft Dynamics, Novartis, and Merck Serono among its first clients.

In December 2018, Jack Morton Worldwide promoted Adrian Taylor to senior vice-president and executive creative director of its London office, succeeding Damian Ferrar, who moved to lead the agency's new global innovation practice, Genuine X.

In March 2025, the company opened a Tokyo office to expand its APAC operations and appointed Mayumi Ninomiya as general manager. The expansion followed over 50% year-on-year growth in Japan in 2024, with clients including Google, Netflix, and Shiseido.

In recent years Jack Morton Worldwide has added capabilities in areas such as: print, television, digital, public events (Special Olympics, 2004 Summer Olympic opening and closing ceremonies); exhibits; digital media; content marketing; broadcast design (The Colbert Report, ESPN Sports Center); and more focused markets like Latinos.

== Major events ==
- In 2002 under the supervision of David Zolkwer produced the opening ceremony of the 2002 Commonwealth Games in Manchester, England
- In 2004 the company produced the opening and closing ceremonies at the 2004 Summer Olympics in Athens, Greece, becoming the first non-local producer of the ceremonies in Olympic history.
- In 2006, Jack Morton Worldwide produced IBM India's largest live communications event for 19,000 employees in India, including 10,000 in Bangalore and 9,000 linked by satellite at sites in Pune, Delhi, Kolkata and Mumbai. The event was also webcast to the company's 330,000 employees worldwide via the Internet.
- Jack Morton Worldwide has been responsible for the Mayor of London's New Year's Eve fireworks display since 2003. The pyrotechnic display over the River Thames and the London Eye is viewed by millions of people on BBC One in 360 video and live by hundreds of thousands more lining both banks of river.
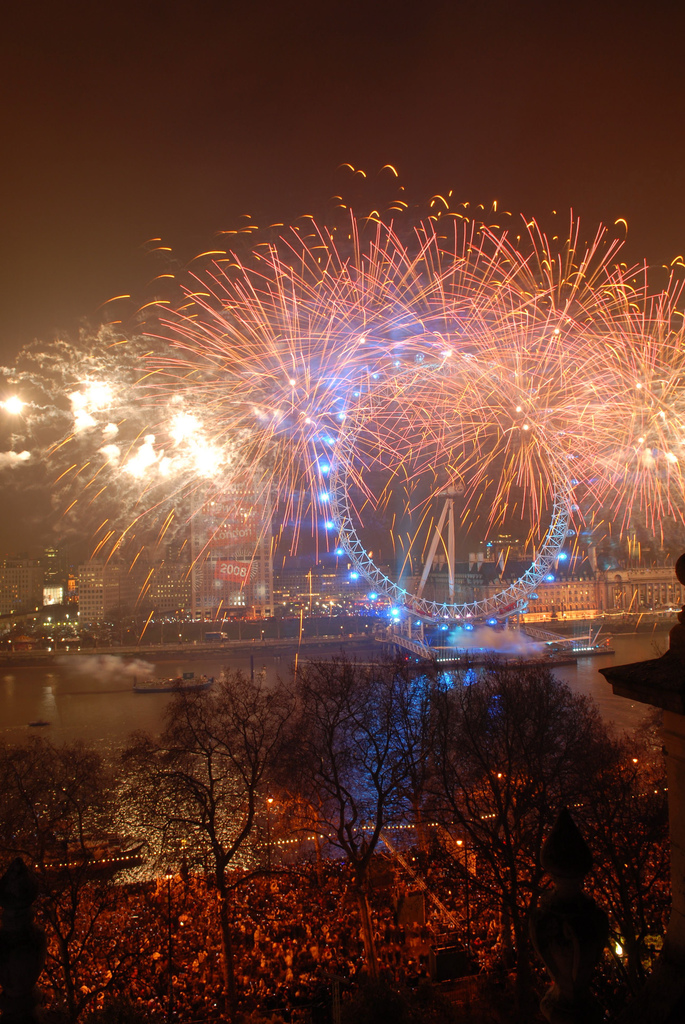
  Fireworks at the London Eye on New Year's Eve.
  After 19 years Jack Morton stepped aside and handed this honor to another agency for the first time in December 2022.

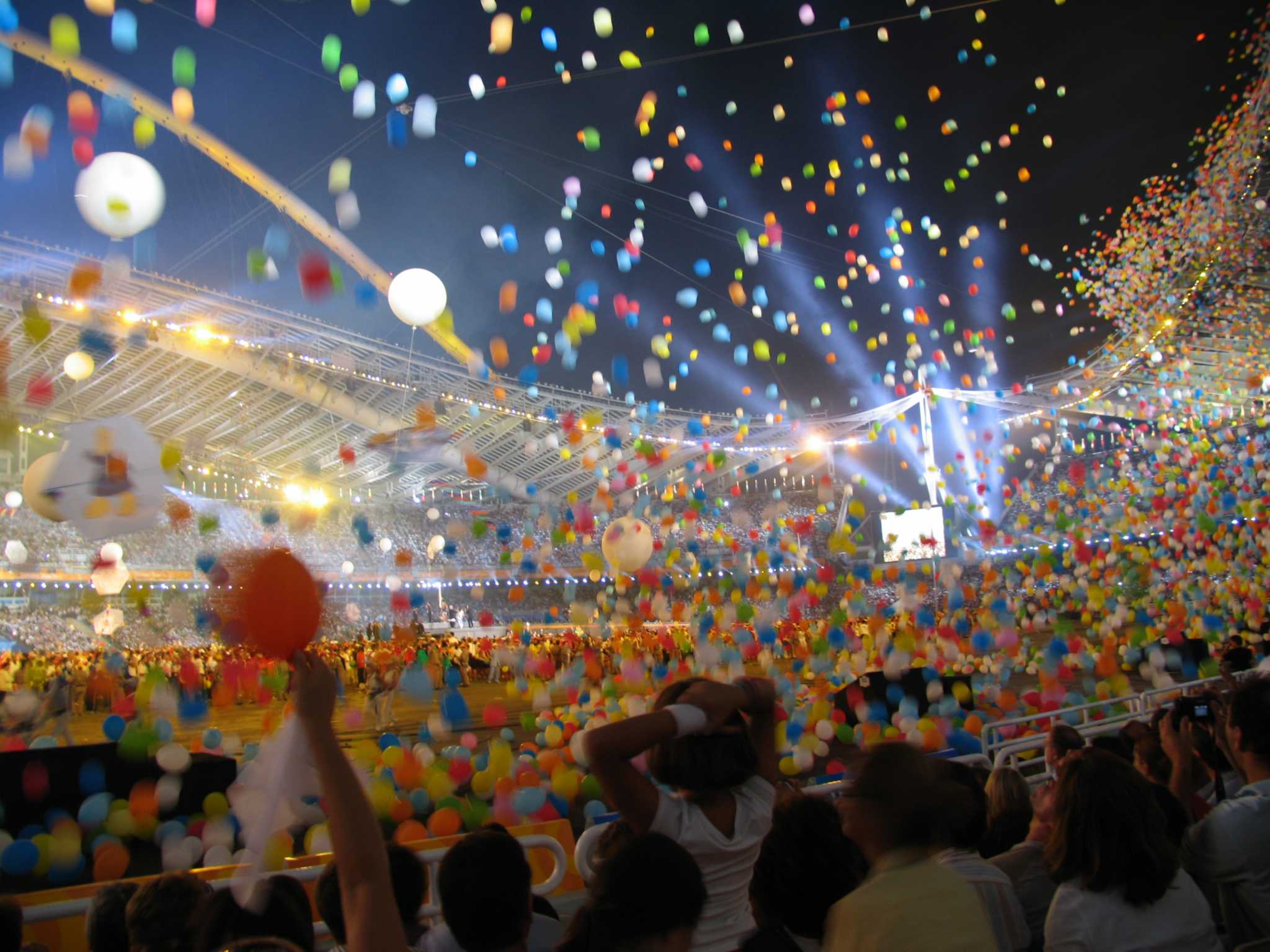
Balloons falling at the Athens 2004 Olympics Closing ceremony

- Jack Morton's London office conceived, planned, and delivered the opening and closing ceremonies for the 2014 Commonwealth Games, held in Glasgow, Scotland over 11 days of competition between 23 July to 3 August 2014.
- Jack Morton was chosen to create the opening film and all other moving image content for the Eurobest European Advertising Festival, which took place in Antwerp on December 1–3, 2015.

== Recent awards ==
- 28th Annual PRO Awards, 2018 Platinum PRO Award for Best Overall Campaign for "CoverGirl Rantin' & Raven"
- MVPro Award for the most award winning campaigns for multiple brands. Jack Morton won for: Charmin, CoverGirl, Liberty Mutual Insurance and Royal Caribbean Cruises

== Offices ==
Jack Morton has offices in Boston, Chicago, Detroit, Los Angeles, New York, Princeton, San Francisco, London, Düsseldorf, Munich, Dubai, Beijing, Shanghai, Hong Kong, Seoul, Singapore, Melbourne, and Sydney; as well as an affiliate in São Paulo; and field offices in Alpharetta, Naperville, Thousand Oaks, Danbury, and Irving.
