= Muru-D =

Australian startup accelerator

muru-D
- Industry: startup accelerator
- Founded: 2013
- Founders: Mick Liubinskas; Annie Parker
- Headquarters: Melbourne, Australia
- Parent: Telstra
- Website: www.muru-d.com

muru-D is the incubation hub of Australian telecommunications company Telstra. To date, over 44 startups have been through its startup accelerator program, with 42 still in operation.

muru-D, stylised with a lowercase 'm', is derived from the Sydney Aboriginal Eora word ‘Muru’, meaning ‘path’, and 'D' standing for digital: ‘path to digital.'

== History ==
muru-D was founded by Annie Parker and Mick Liubinkas in October 2013 after Telstra recognised that it needed to be more involved in the tech startup scene. It was officially opened by former Prime Minister of Australia, Malcolm Turnbull.

In 2015, muru-D expanded operations to Singapore due to its "fast-developing start-up ecosystem, pro-business policies and access to local capital."

At the end of 2016, Annie Parker left muru-D and was replaced by ex-Salesforce executive, Julie Trell.

In 2017, muru-D altered its funding model to be more founder friendly and attract later-stage startups. It also launched its new IoT themed space in Melbourne, based at Telstra's Gurrowa Labs.
