= Karl Muru =

Estonian scholar and literary critic

Karl Muru (1 January 1927 Pikkjärve, Kaarepere Parish (now Jõgeva Parish) – 30 May 2017) was an Estonian literary scholar and literary critic.

In 1958 he graduated from the University of Tartu. Since 1958 he taught at Tartu University, and became a professor there in 1978.

His major work was the Estonian poetry anthology "Sõnarine".

In 2002, he was awarded with the Order of the White Star, IV class.

== Works ==
- 1975: article collection "Vaated kolmest aknast"
- 1987: article collection "Kodus ja külas"
- 1989–1995: poetry collection "Sõnarine" I–IV
- 2001: article collection "Luuleseletamine"
- 2014: article collection "Rännul luuleilmas"
