= Utu (Māori concept) =

Māori concept of reciprocation or balance

Utu is a Māori concept of reciprocation or balance.

To retain mana, both friendly and unfriendly actions require an appropriate response; that is, utu covers both the reciprocation of kind deeds, and the seeking of revenge.

Utu is one of the key principles of the constitutional tradition of Māori along with whanaungatanga (the centrality of relationships), mana and tapu/noa (the recognition of the spiritual dimension). Along with equivalent traditions in other Indigenous communities, it has also been cited as an influence in attempts to introduce restorative justice into the criminal justice systems both in New Zealand and elsewhere.

Utu can also be used about monetary repayments, paying or repaying.

== Cultural references ==
- Utu, a 1983 New Zealand film loosely based on events from Te Kooti's War
- Anderson, Nate (19 May 2006). "Amazon's "one-click" patent reconsidered". Ars Technica. A modern example of the term's use within New Zealand society.

== See also ==
- Restorative justice
